= Bestiality with a donkey =

Sexual relations between humans and donkeys

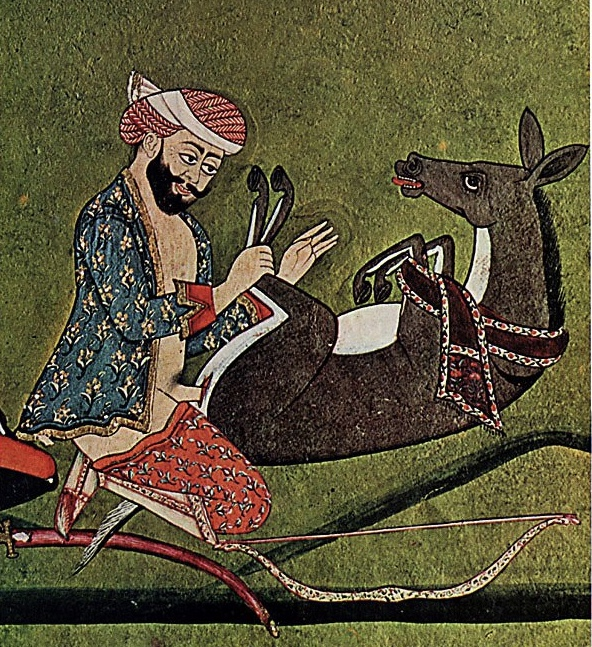
19th-century Persian miniature art work that depicts bestiality with a donkey

According to various sexologist studies, donkeys are one of the most preferred animals for zoophilia. People who have sex with donkeys may face fines, imprisonment, or capital punishment, depending on the country, and references to bestiality with donkeys may be censored by some governments and publishers. Bestiality with donkeys is more common in rural areas.

Literature, art, and elements of popular culture documenting, referring to, or featuring sex with donkeys have been produced since ancient times. These include depictions on or in gas lamps, stelae, paintings, films, pornography, theater shows, cartoons, novels, poems, jokes, slang, and folk tales. There are also various religious and mythological sources containing beliefs and narratives about donkey sex. In some societies, it is believed that there are benefits to having sex with donkeys.

== Etymology ==
In Turkish slang, the term eşekçi (one who rents out donkeys) is used to describe people who are in the habit of having sexual relations with donkeys. Donkeys used for sex are called Kadifegül, Nallı Fatma, Fatmagül or Eşogelin in some regions of Turkey. In Evliya Çelebi's Seyahatnâme, the phrase eşek filan edici refers to men who have sex with donkeys. The people of the region of Colombia where donkey sex is common are known among other Colombians as comeburras, Spanish for "donkey eaters".

References to sex with donkeys may also be used as insults or racial slurs. The Russian word Oslayob means "donkey fucker" and is used as a generic insult. In Arab countries, the expression "donkey fucker" is considered a racist slur. According to Justine Hardy's book, the term "donkey boy" is used in Pakistan and North India to denigrate and ridicule men who are the receptive partners in anal intercourse.

== Frequency of occurrence ==
A meta-analysis published in 2021 estimated that about 2% of the general population engaged in zoophilic acts. Sexologists Hani Miletski, Andrea Beetz, Colin J. Williams and Martin S. Weinberg conducted a study of people who have had sex with animals and found that animals in the equine family are the most preferred animal species for zoophilia after dogs. Another survey of 171 people in 2010 reported that donkeys were the most preferred animal species for sex (73) after mares (80). Of the 144 cases of zoophilia found by Zeb Tortorici in archives in Guatemala, Mexico, Spain and the United States, 42.2% were with female donkeys.

In 2002, an online survey of men who claimed to have had sex with an animal was conducted among 114 participants with a median age of 27 years. Of the participants, 91% of whom were American and 83% of whom had graduated from a university or equivalent educational institution, 29% reported having had intercourse with a member of the Equidae family. Of those who continued to actively engage in bestiality, 39% said they have had sex with a member of the Equidae. All of those who had ever had sex with an Equidae reported having vaginal intercourse with the animal, while half of the respondents also reported having anal intercourse with the animal. In addition, 14% of those who had had sex with a member of the Equidae family said they had had oral intercourse with the animal.

== History ==
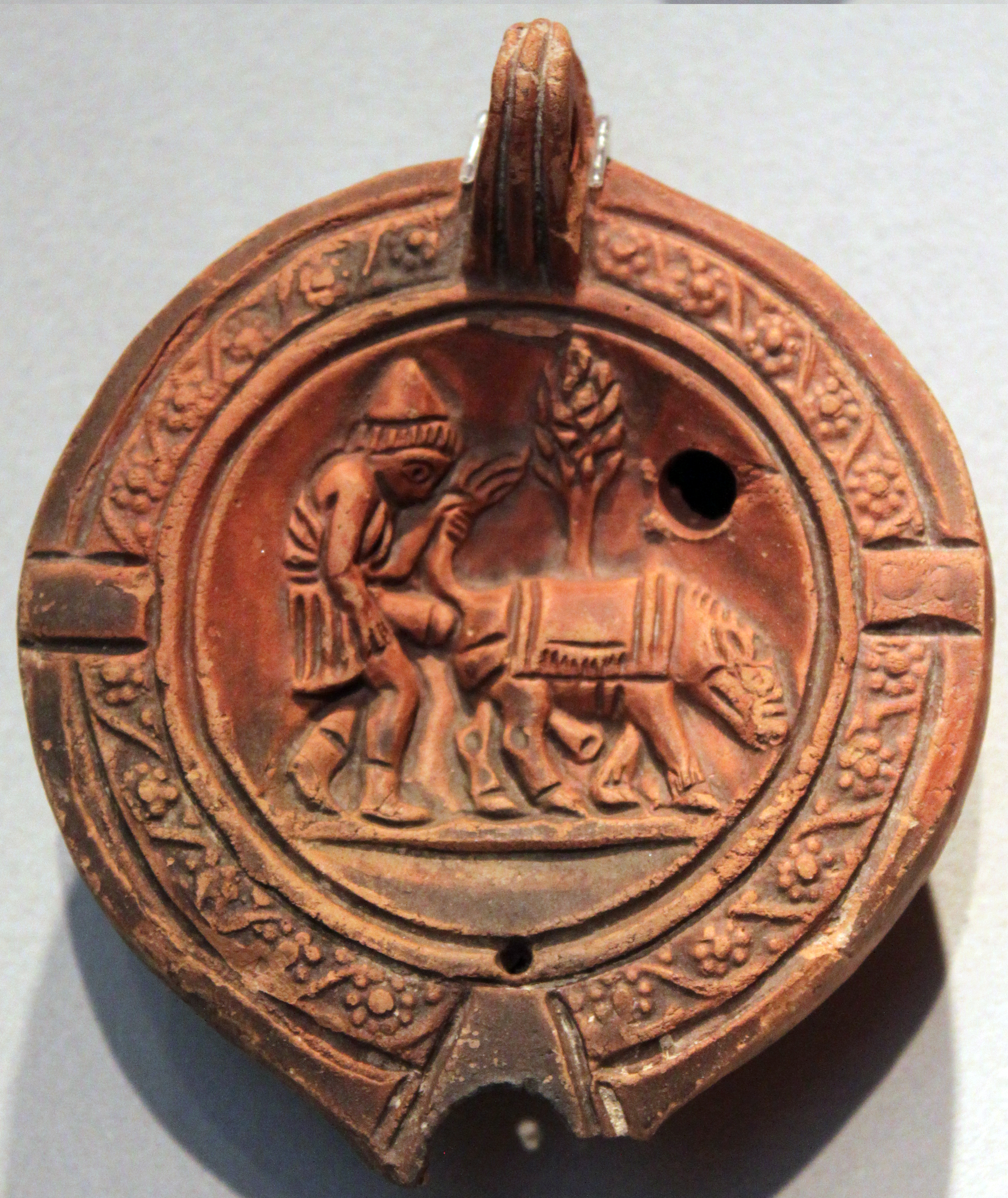
Ancient Roman gas lamp depicting sex with a donkey

=== Antiquity ===
In Hittite laws (specifically Clauses 187–200), sexual relations with animals were strictly categorized based on the perceived religious pollution (hurkel). While acts with certain animals like cows, sheep, pigs, or dogs were considered capital offenses, having sex with a horse or a mule was explicitly exempted from punishment. Donkeys also held a complex position; while not explicitly listed as a capital offense in the same manner as cattle, they were symbols of potent sexuality, and such acts are allegedly alluded to on the Hittite Inandık vase.

Hittite ritual texts also addressed sexual dysfunction through symbolic magic rather than bestial imagery. In the "Ritual of Paškuwatti" (CTH 406), a female practitioner treated male impotence by symbolically reassigning the patient's gender: she would take feminine symbols, such as a spindle and distaff, from the man and replace them with a bow and arrow to restore his masculine virility.

In contrast, ancient Mesopotamian potency incantations (ŠÀ.ZI.GA) utilized aggressive animal copulation imagery as sympathetic magic. These texts, often mistakenly grouped with Hittite traditions in general surveys, frequently invoked the sexual vigor of donkeys and bucks. One such Assyrian ritual (KAR 236) involved the following Akkadian incantation:

lim-gu-ug anše-ma munus.anše li-ir-kab

lit-bi da-áš-šú li-ir-tak-ka-bu ú-ni-qí x

ina sag gišnú-ia lu ra-ki-is da-áš-˹šú˺

ina še-pit gišnú-ia lu ra-ki-is pu-ha-lu4

šá sag gišnú-ia ti-bá-a ra-man-ni

šá še-pit gišnú-ia ti-bá-a hu-ub-<bi>-ba-an-ni

ú-ru-ú-a ú-ru munus.ur ú-šar-šú ú-šar ur.ku

gim ú-ru munus.ur iṣ-ba-tú ú-šar ur.ku

"May the donkey swell up! May he mount the jenny! May the buck get an erection! May he repeatedly mount the female-kid! At the head of my bed, indeed, a buck is tied! At the foot of my bed, indeed, a stag is tied! The one at the head of my bed: get an erection! Make love to me! The one at the foot of my bed: get an erection! Caress me! My vagina is the vagina of a bitch! His penis is the penis of a dog! Like the vagina of a bitch seizes the penis of a dog, may my vagina seize his penis!" (Note: While the ritual uses explicit bestial language, scholars such as Ilan Peled emphasize that this was a psychological tool of sympathetic magic intended to "arouse" the patient by invoking nature's raw vitality, rather than a description of an actual act of bestiality performed during the rite.)

In Ancient Egypt, curses inflicting donkey rape can be found from the Pharaonic period to the Coptic period, usually inscribed on stelae. According to a book written during the reign of Ramesses III, a donkey will have sex with the wife and children of one who has intercourse with it. It was also written that if a woman had sex with a donkey, great misfortune would befall her, as if she had had intercourse with an Assyrian. The Donation Stele of King Tefnakht describes a "donkey curse" for those who disturb the fields he gave to the goddess Neith:

"As for the one who will disturb them, the wrath of Neith comes to be against him forever and ever. His son will not be confirmed in his office. May the donkey rape him; may the donkey (rape) his wife and his children. May he go to the fiery blast of the mouth of Sakhmet and to the oath of the Lord of the universe and (that of) the gods altogether..."

In Ancient Greece, donkeys were viewed disfavorably; to accuse someone's mother of having intercourse with a donkey was to accuse her not just of bestiality, but of bestiality with a particularly grotesque and demeaning beast. Aristo of Ephesus was recorded to have had sex with a female donkey. Sex with donkeys is implicitly mentioned in Aristophanes' comedies The Frogs and The Wasps; according to Wolfgang Luppe, the allusions are not entirely unhistorical. In a theater performance in ancient Corinth, a woman had sex with a donkey.

Apuleius wrote of wealthy Romans having sex with donkeys. Juvenal, in his book of Satires, mentions women who were guilty of having sex with donkeys. Pliny the Elder wrote that donkey penises soaked in oil and hyena penises covered in honey were sexual fetishes of women living at the time. In History of the Wars, Byzantine historian Procopius wrote that the Heruli, especially those with donkeys, copulated in an "unholy manner"; scholars believe his claims were likely exaggerated.

=== Middle Ages and Modern Age ===
In Ibn al-Jawzī's Adqiya, he mentions the brilliance of a physician who treated a patient with an unusually swollen penis. The physician guessed that the man had had sex with a donkey, during which a grain entered his penis. He then struck the man's penis with a hammer to get rid of the grain blocking it. Both European and Arab writers were cautious in transcribing this incident. In the 11th century book Picatrix, a decan description in the Pisces III chapter mentions a woman mounted by a donkey.

According to Mehmed al-Ghazali, sex with donkeys was a common male activity in Egypt, to the extent that stories about it spread and no one denied having sex with a donkey. al-Ghazali also mentions donkey houses in the region, in which men could pay to have sex with donkeys.

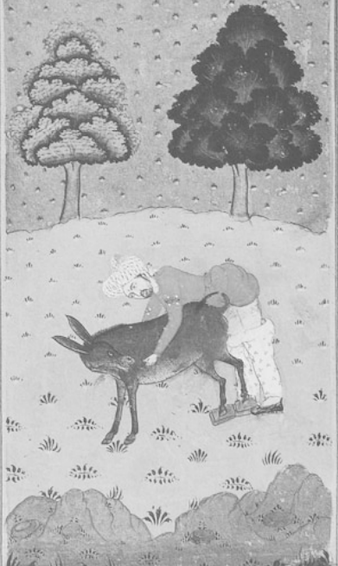
Painting depicting a man immobilized after being caught having sex with his donkey in Algeria

In early modern Europe, bestiality, more common in rural areas, was considered a threat to civilized society. At the time, animals were prosecuted for crimes, including the crime of having sex with humans; this resulted in animals being executed alongside people who had intercourse with them. In the 1575 conviction of one Legaigneux, magistrates condemned the man to be hanged after being forced to watch the execution of the donkey he was convicted to have had sex with. In the 16th century, most Europeans thought that Muslims had sex with animals, especially donkeys.

In the early modern era, trials of people who had sex with donkeys took place in many European countries. Although the records were often burned after the trials, more than 100 bestiality trials in France between the 13th and 17th centuries have survived. On January 8, 1558, in Villeneuve-l'Archevêque, a donkey rider who was tried for having sex with a donkey was burned with his donkey after being executed by hanging. On November 24, 1542, in a similar case before the Parliament of Paris, a man from the commune of Loudun was burned with his donkey after being strangled to death for having sex with it. In 1567, the Court of Aragon in Spain sentenced five men to work on a galley after they were found to have had sex with a donkey. In 1572, nine peasants were executed for having sex with donkeys or mules. In a news report dated September 2, 1595, it is written that a man accused of having sex with a donkey by 2 men and 2 women in Portugal was burned to death with the donkey in Rossio Square. According to the report, immediately after the burning, the man was found to be innocent, and those who accused him of having sex with the donkey were also burned to death. In the late 16th century, in a case of bestiality in France, it was decided that the female donkey would be stoned to death in front of the man on the gallows and then the man would be executed by hanging. In 1612, Domingos Marquez, the second black man to be burned to death in Portugal, was burned for "disgraceful behavior with a donkey in public". From the 17th century onwards, judges began to issue more pardons for donkeys. In 1750 in France, a man and a female donkey who were found to have had sex were brought to court and tried. While the court decided to execute the man, the donkey was found not guilty. The comments of the villagers about the donkey and the man were influential in this decision. When Frederick the Great pardoned a man caught having sex with a donkey, he said: "In Prussia, man has freedom of both his head and his tail (penis)".

A man who saw a British merchant held captive in Ottoman Algeria was petrified while having sex with his favorite donkey. The British merchant described what he saw as follows: "In a small meadow where excellent grass grew, I saw something that resembled a man resting on the ass of his donkey. They looked so lifelike that from a distance I thought they were alive, but when I came closer I saw that they were perfect statues." This incident was reported in the London press in 1670.

It is mentioned in the sources that some rulers had sex with donkeys. Zhu Yousong is known to have had sex with a donkey. According to one rumor, Catherine the Great had a donkey that she used for sex. According to Finucci, Caterina Sforza preferred the dried penis of a donkey for what she called a spectacular enlargement of the sexual organ.

== Sex with donkeys by region in recent times ==
=== Asia ===
According to linguist Gyula József Décsy's book, sex between a human and a donkey is the main taboo in Asia related to the concept of bestiality.

==== West Asia ====
According to a 1938 medical academic paper, donkeys are the most commonly used animal for bestiality among Arabs. In some plays performed in Turkey, there are references to sex with a donkey or the role of a man in such a scenario. In a scene in the Turkish play Hastane mi Kestane mi?, there is a reference to sex with a donkey. In a scene set in a hospital, the patient tells the nurse that he has no health problems except that he was kicked by a donkey. The nurse then asks why the donkey kicked him. The patient replies, "Don't question why; this is a romantic relationship." In the game of değirmen döndürme, sexuality is shown in the form of sex with a donkey. sex with donkeys is also seen in the game of Değirmenci played in Uruş and Yenice villages of Oğuzeli district of Gaziantep.

Turkish has expressions that include references to sex with donkeys. There are expressions in Turkish that mean "Our national bride is donkey." In Central Anatolia Region of Turkey, people who are clumsy and incompetent in handicrafts are called "Haven't you ever had sex with a donkey?". In Turkish culture, sex with donkeys is sometimes a source of humor. In 1973, a four-day gala to celebrate the twenty-fifth anniversary of the founding of Atlantic Records was being organized. When Jerry Wexler fell asleep, Ahmet Ertegün replaced the photo in Wexler's passport with one of a woman having sex with a donkey. In Paris, the gendarmerie, seeing the photo in the passport, first looked at the photo, then at Wexler, and then at the photo again. As Ertegün collapsed with laughter, Wexler tried to help the gendarmerie by saying "I used to have a beard". In the 36th volume of Leman magazine published in 1991, the statement "He who has sexual relations with a donkey has platonic feelings for a lynx!" appears.

A study analyzing Tweets shared on Twitter between November 2020 and May 2021 found that donkeys, along with dogs, were the animal most frequently used to negatively portray Kurds as animals, and Kurds were frequently accused of having sexual relations with donkeys. There is a Kurdish proverb, Fêda gavana nihandina kera ye, which means "The benefit of the cattleman is to have sex with the donkey."

In the 19th century, as homosexuality among men became widespread in Iran, soldiers were advised to follow Saadi's advice about sex with donkeys. Wilhelm Gollmann, a German doctor, states that the Iranians used to have sex with donkeys as a remedy for coccalgia.

The allegation that a Palestinian farmer traveling with his donkey was captured by Israeli soldiers and forced to have sex with his donkey has spread through the Palestinian community.

==== East Asia ====
In 1873, the monastic head of a Buddhist temple in Beijing told a Japanese pilgrim that if he entered the Holy of Holies of a mosque, he would find a statue of a woman having sex with a donkey, a Muslim idol.

In the city of Kashgar, a man having sex with a donkey is a matter of ridicule for the man and even his family. The shame felt by the people in a village where a case of sex with a donkey has occurred is enough to have all the female donkeys in the village sent away.

==== Central Asia ====
Zoophilia is not uncommon in Central Asia among young people without access to human partners. İlhan Başgöz and religious historian Julian Baldick claim that in Shamanist societies in Central Asia, young people had sex with donkeys.

"Show me an Afghan soldier who hasn't screwed a donkey and I'll show you a liar" was a joke told among American soldiers in Afghanistan, mocking the practice of having sex with donkeys. In a study analyzing the plays performed by the Ghorbati people, it was found that half of the cases of bestiality in the plays were with donkeys.

==== South Asia ====
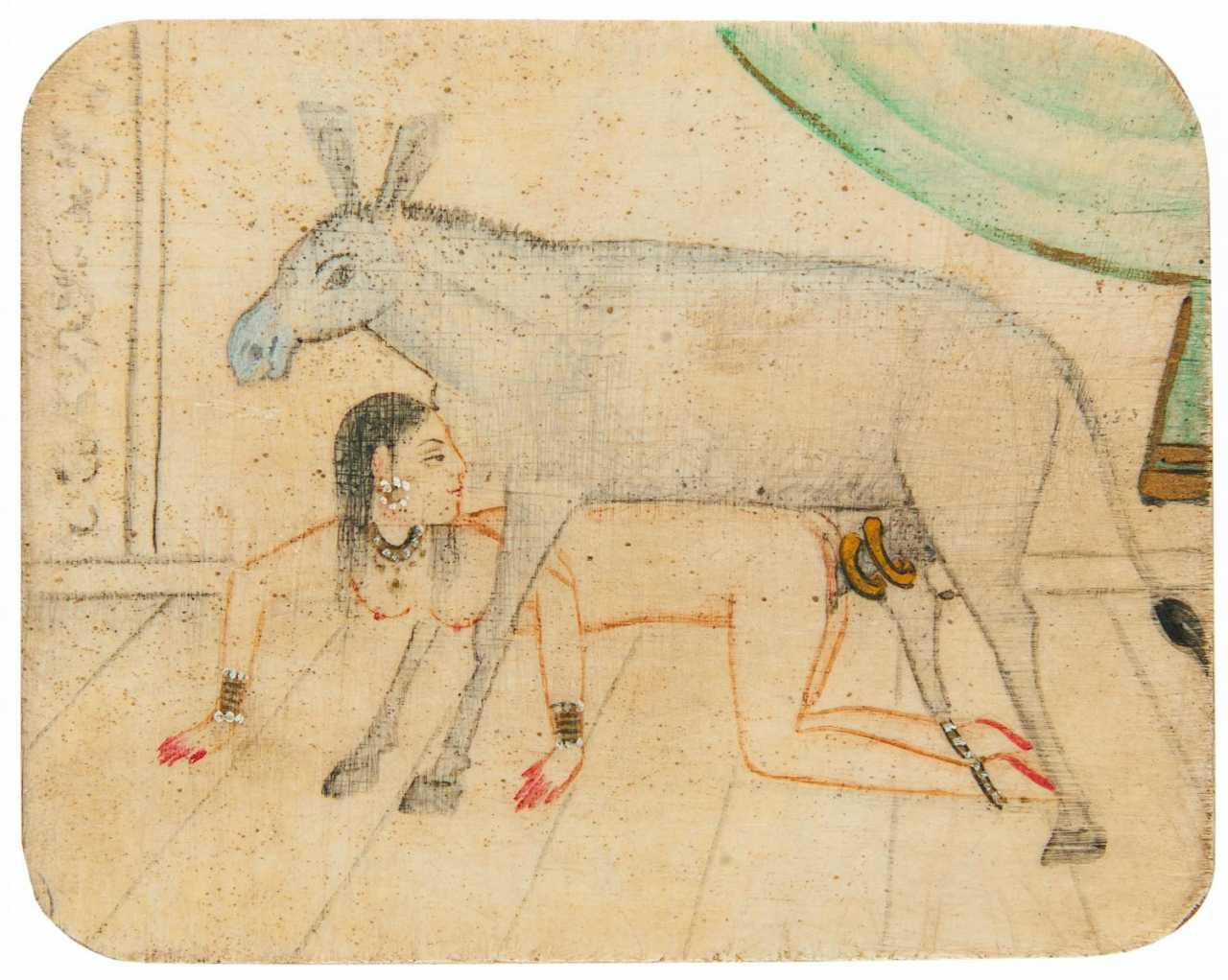
A 19th-century painting depicting a woman having sex with a donkey, India

In rural areas of India, sex with a female donkey is observed. Adolescents often have sex with the female donkey. According to a rumor in India, having sex with a donkey cures AIDS by destroying the HIV virus. Another belief is that sex with a female donkey cures gonorrhea. The Badagas believe that fatal venereal diseases can only be cured by having sex with a donkey. If the donkey dies immediately after intercourse, the man is considered to be cured of the venereal disease. Some Europeans traveling by caravan in northern India have reported seeing people having sex with donkeys. According to the historian Peter Boomgaard, these cases are situational.

According to Google search results, donkey sex is also searched for in Pakistan, the country where bestiality is the most searched for on the Internet. Iqbal Masih was allegedly killed by a man he saw having sex with a donkey. The allegation, based on police reports and the testimonies of Iqbal's cousins, has been ignored by the global media because it seems implausible that the man who had sex with the donkey killed only Iqbal and not the two cousins with Iqbal. In Pakistan, a donkey that was raped by another villager after escaping from its owner was killed by the owner after being declared a kari ("adulterous female"), The News International reported.

=== Europe ===
Some Russian officers serving in the 1828-1829 Ottoman-Russian War in Wallachia shunned women for fear of contracting sexual diseases, often preferring to have intercourse with female donkeys who showed signs of sexual pleasure. In 1843, a man found to have had sex with a donkey in England was exiled to Australia. French anthropologist Marie-Christine Anest reports that until the 1980s in Crete and Cyprus, males aged between 6 and 17 had sex with female donkeys. Among the South Slavs, donkeys were one of the main animals used for sex.

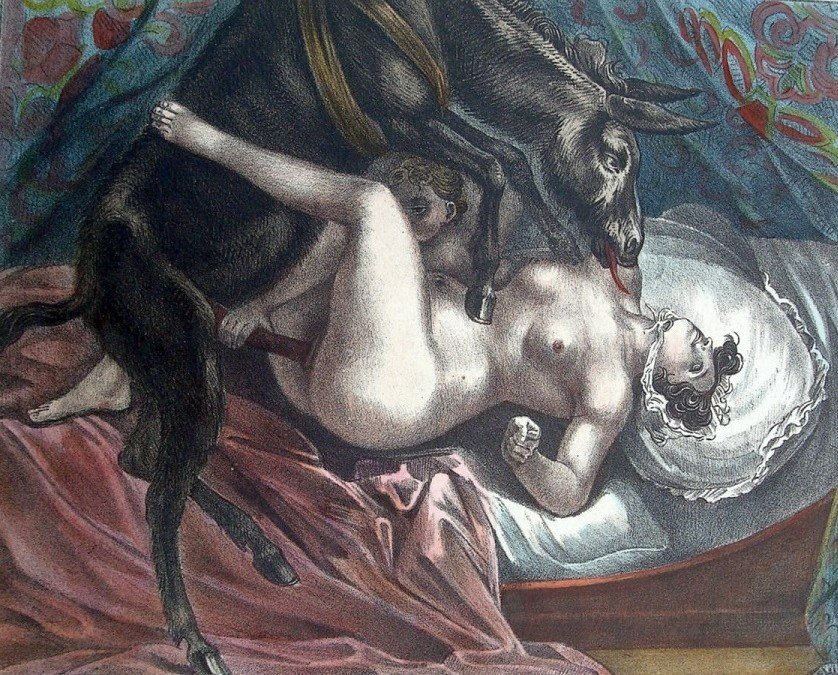
Two girls and a donkey, Achille Devéria

In British culture, donkey sex is a light topic and is used to shame and ridicule those allegedly involved. There is a significant amount of humorous content on Twitter about bestiality. References to zoophilia with animals other than donkeys are not considered humorous.

One of the Romani jokes known in Andalusia references sex with a donkey. In the joke, when a Romani is selling donkeys in the town of Baza, one of the donkeys gets an erection. The Guardia, who wants to trick the Romani, says that he will fine the Romani if he does not get rid of the donkey's erection. The Romani protests, saying he has no control over the donkey, but the Guardia stands firm. When the Guardia walks away, the Romani bites hard on the donkey's ear, hurting the donkey and causing donkey to lose erection. When the Guardia returns, he is surprised and asks the Romani how he did it. The Romani tells him that he told the donkey "If you don't lower it, the Guardia will suck the thing". According to Brandes, it is intended to emphasize the intelligence, large penises, and sexual power of the Romani people with this joke.

=== Africa ===
==== North Africa ====
There is a belief in Morocco that anal and vaginal intercourse with donkeys enlarges the penis.

An anonymous researcher conducting anthropological fieldwork in rural Algeria saw a young man nervously having sexual intercourse with a donkey the day before his wedding. The young man's aim was clearly to avoid appearing desperate and incompetent to his wife on their wedding night. Kabyle people do not keep donkeys or eat donkey meat, probably because of their sexual intercourse with donkeys in the distant past. Vicotr Jiřík reported in his 1913 book K pyramidám that he saw a woman having sexual intercourse with a donkey in Alexandria.

==== Sub-Saharan Africa ====
The practice of having sex with female donkeys has been reported to exist among Masai youth. They believe that having sex with a donkey improves their lovemaking skills. While such behavior is not uncommon among adolescent boys to "relieve their sexual urges by copulating with donkeys," it is said that "these acts are considered to be activities of children and beneath the dignity and pride of adult Maasai." Iraqw people are reported to have sex with donkeys. According to the Hausa villagers, if a man has become rich, he has either had sex with a donkey or with another man. Donkey sex is also practiced among the Mossi people. Young Mossi people who cannot have intercourse with women because they have not yet been circumcised have sex with donkeys. In Mossi culture, men who continue to have sex with donkeys after youth are believed to be cursed.

As of 2018, Ethiopia, home to the world's largest donkey population with more than 8.5 million donkeys, has also seen cases of donkey sex. Ethiopia is the country with the highest number of Google searches for donkey sex videos in relation to population.

=== America ===
==== North America ====
According to ethnologist and psychoanalyst George Devereux account, sex with mares, donkeys, cows, calves existed among the Mohave and Quechan people. Hopis have also been reported to have sex with donkeys. According to one account, in ancient Pueblo Indians society, some religious ceremonies could not begin until everyone laughed, so the jesters would have sex with the donkey before the ceremony to make everyone laugh and relieve tension.

According to one rumor, originating in the 1960s and put forward by opponents of sex education in the US, young people were taught about sex with donkeys in sex education classes. In Jack Hanna's book Jungle Jack, an attorney for the Columbus Zoo testified that a mother was mounted and humped by a donkey in front of her children as she bent down to tie her shoes at the zoo. Afterward, the woman told zoo officials over the phone that she was going to sue, but later backed down when she thought the incident would become more widely known.

==== Central America and Mexico ====
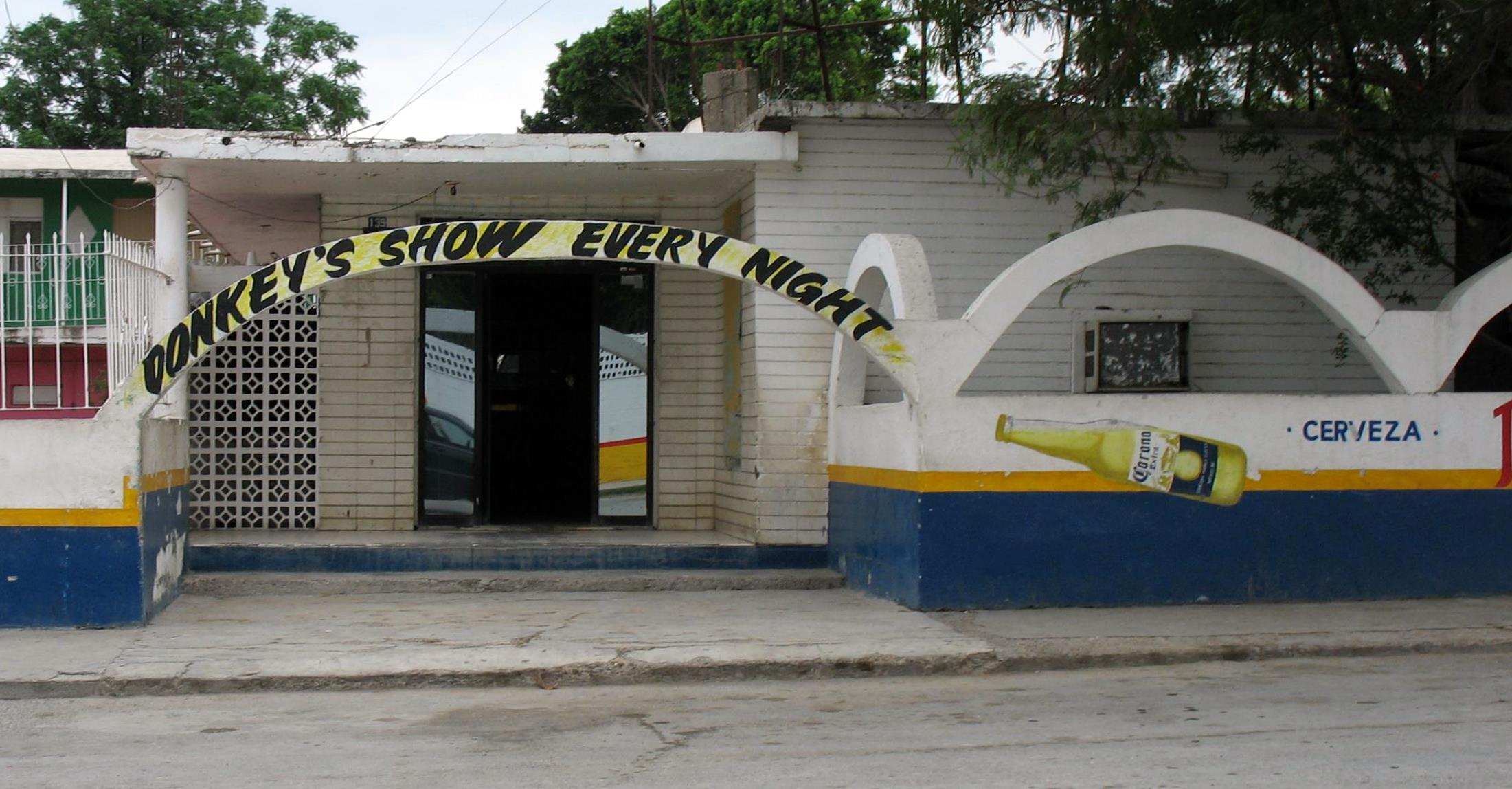
An advertisement for a donkey show in Nuevo Laredo, Mexico. In these shows, prostitutes allegedly have intercourse with donkeys.

In Panama, there were nightclubs where women had sex with donkeys. At donkey shows in Tijuana, Mexico, prostitutes are said to publicly engage in sex with donkeys. However, there is very little documentation of this. According to the 1981 book New West, taxi drivers offered to take tourists arriving in Tijuana to the red light district to watch donkey performances. Donkey shows were on a list of reasons to visit Tijuana in 2008. In contrast, Gustavo Arellano claims that donkey shows are not real. In Juarez, another city where public cases of donkey sex are alleged to have occurred, donkey shows are allegedly held in disposable buildings made of papier-mâché. In the north of Costa Rica and Honduras, there have been reports of young people having intercourse with a female donkey.

==== South America ====
Donkey sex occurs on the Caribbean coast of Colombia. According to a belief among young people in Colombia, a man who has intercourse with a donkey grows a longer penis, ready for sex with a woman.

Small donkeys are one of the animals used for sex in Northwest Brazil. A priest caused a scandal in a Brazilian village when he preached a sermon on the evils of having sex with donkeys and chickens.

== Depictions ==
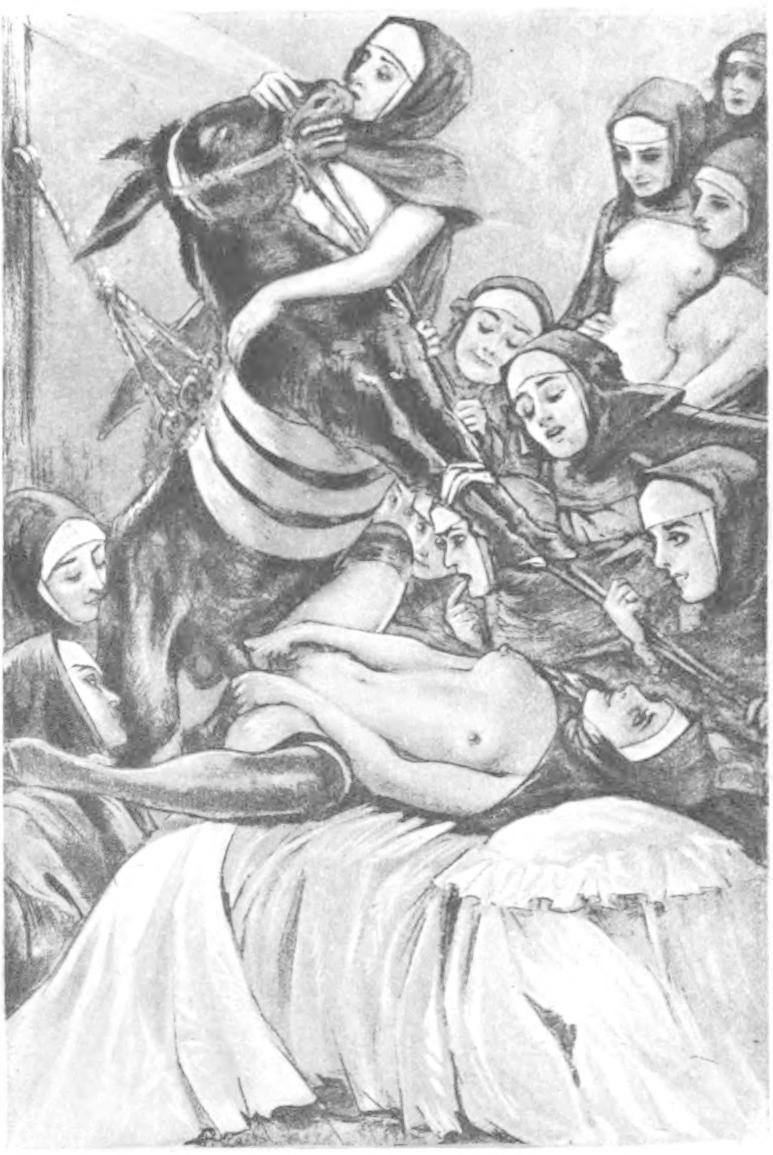
A drawing from the Gamiani book

Depictions of sex with donkeys are found on cave, clay, vase and kerosene lamp materials. The cave painting in the Val Camonica rock paintings, estimated to date to the 8th millennium BC, depicts a man having sex with a donkey. In an engraving on brown clay found in Egypt and dated between 900 BC and 586 BC, an animal, thought to be a donkey, has sex with a woman. In one of the ancient Egyptian amulets, in which the presence of Set in depiction is intended to announce the threatening side of the god, the depiction shows a squatting woman above a donkey with an erect penis, who is penetrating the woman. A 26 cm-long artifact found in Ravanusa, a mixture of a vase and a statuette dating to 510-500 BC, depicts a half-human, half-goat-like satyr having sex with a donkey. A Roman flask dated to the 2nd or 3rd century AD from the city of Bakchias depicts a woman and a donkey with an erect penis preparing to have sex with her. In 1780, Abbé Giffon discovered a Roman bas-relief depicting a donkey having sex with a woman in the Apt commune of Provence-Alpes-Côte d'Azur. A painting from the Hellenistic period shows a man secretly having sex with a donkey. Athenian Band Cup by the Oakeshott Painter (MET 17.230.5) depicts a satyr preparing to sodomize a male donkey. In a kantharos painted by Epictetus, a donkey with an erect penis is seen next to an almost naked maenad. The woman appears as if she is inviting the excited donkey to sex with her. A gas lamp from Ancient Greece from 150 to 250 AD depicts a woman having sex with a donkey. Two Cyprus-made gas lamps on display in the British Museum depict a woman having sex with a donkey or horse. One of the Homeric vases depicting millers working in a flour mill includes a scene of theft and an attempt to sexually stimulate a donkey.

Some of the sculptures in India depicting sex in which the man takes the active role depict an aristocratic-looking man having intercourse with a donkey. In depictions where the animal takes the active role, the woman is often depicted having sex with a donkey. In a temple in Vijayanagara, a menstruating woman is depicted having sex with a donkey or horse. There are gadhegals in various parts of India, which are steles depicting women having sex with donkeys. The stone depicting Ganesha, found in a place of worship in Erandwane, India, depicts a man being punished with a donkey for forcing a woman in his family to have sex with a donkey. The duration of the man's punishment with a donkey is indicated by the sun and moon symbols carved on the stone. A 12th century AD stone slab found in the village of Daranagar and exhibited in the Allahabad Museum depicts a woman having sex with a donkey. A mid-13th-century inscription describing an engraved image depicting a woman having sex with a donkey found in Jhansi and Vidisha in Central India states that "the father of the transgressor turned into a donkey". A pillar in India depicts a donkey-like animal in a relationship with a woman. The woman in the depiction was bent over with the help of a pot.

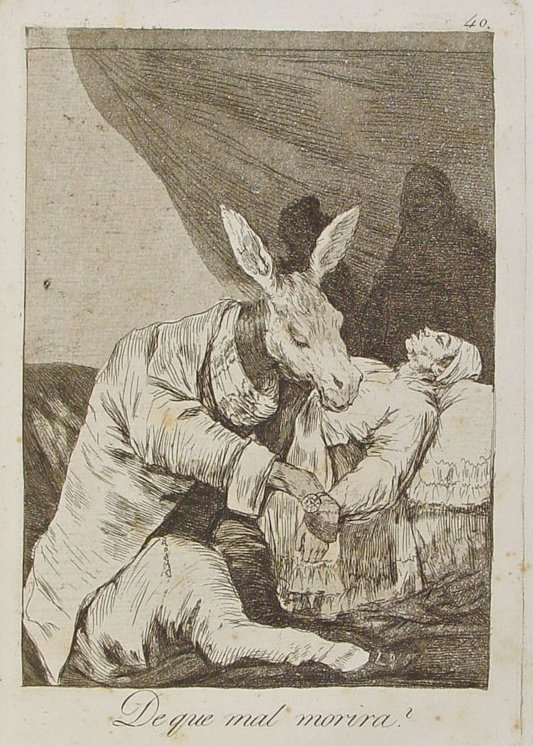
¿De qué mal morirá?, 1799, one of Goya's paintings referring to sexual relations with donkeys

Francisco Goya painted many paintings of big-eared donkeys dressed as school teachers. These paintings were a reference to sexual relations between humans and animals.

== Health effects ==
People who have sex with donkeys can develop various diseases. A 2008 study found that a 20-year-old shepherd who had sex with a donkey developed Hodgkin's disease as a result of the relationship. Trichophyton bullosum, a fungal skin disease in donkeys, can also be transmitted to humans through contact. Previously seen in humans in Africa and the Middle East, the disease was first seen in Europe in 2012. In the case detected in rural areas of France, the disease is thought to have been transmitted from donkey to human. In Morocco in 2017, 15 young people who had sex with donkeys were reported to have rabies.

Sex with donkeys can also cause physical harm. A farmer who had intercourse with a medium-sized farm animal, presumed to be a donkey, had wounds around the anus, a tear at the inflection point of the rectum and pale skin. A computed tomography scan showed injury to the proximal rectum, 7 to 10 centimeters from the opening of the rectum. A man in Kenya who had sex with a donkey developed penile complications. Donkey kicks during sex can injure or kill a person. In August 2014, it was reported that a Saudi man who tried to have sex with a donkey died after the donkey kicked him in the head and chest.

== Literature ==
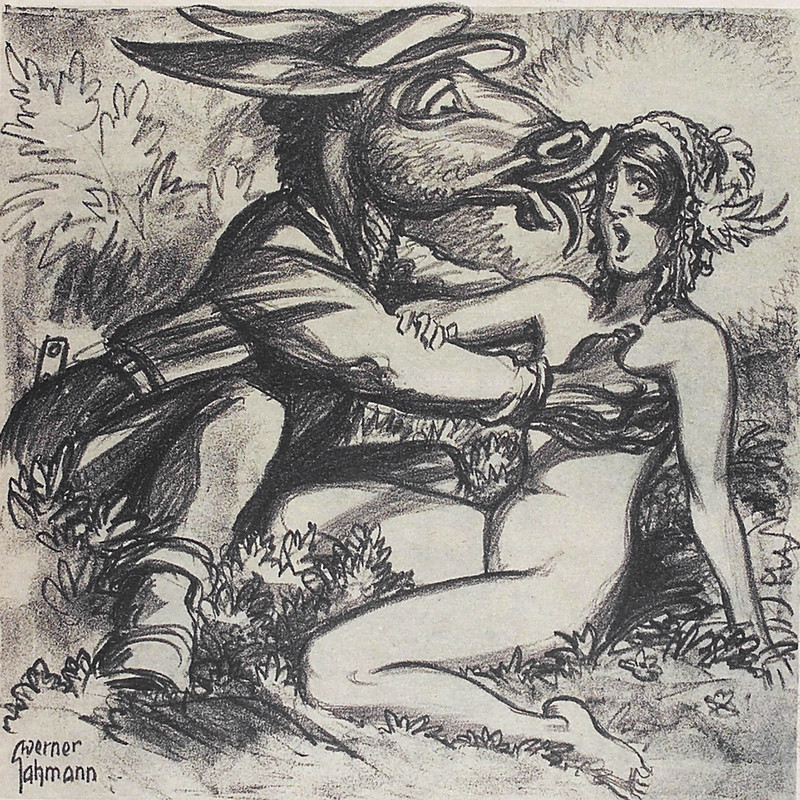
Painting titled Bringing Back the Lost Feeling, published in the 1927 issue of the satirical German magazine Kladderadatsch

Sex with a donkey is mentioned in Aesop's Fables. While waiting to be executed in Delphi, Aesop tells tales and fables to the Delphites about themselves. Aesop's friend visits him in prison and asks, "Why does it seem good to you to insult them (the Delphites) while they are in captivity in their own country? Have you preached to the people and become a fool?" and scolds Aesop. Aesop responds with a fable about a foolish girl and the woman who prays for her daughter:

"One day, while walking down the road, the girl encounters a man violently raping a donkey and asks him what he is doing. The man replies, "I am giving him advice" (νοῦν ἐντίθημι αὐτῇ). The girl persuades him after saying "give me some advice too". Then, as if triumphant, the girl turns to her mother and says "I have wisdom". The mother, after listening to the whole story, laments, "Oh child, you have lost even the wisdom you had."

Aesop expresses that the same thing happened in his own case and that when he came to Delphi he lost even the wisdom he had. In the analogical relationship between Aesop's own situation and the fable, the girl's mother is Aesop's friend, the girl is Aesop and the Delphites are the man who rapes the donkey. In two fables in Esopete ystoriado, there are passages that directly and indirectly emphasize that men want to have sex with donkeys.

In The Tale of the Jealous Wife in book 10 of the ancient Roman fable The Golden Ass, it is considered symbolically appropriate that the woman who, out of anger, jealousy, and greed, plans to kill her husband, daughter and two others by poisoning them, is executed by having sex with a donkey.

Sex with donkeys also occurs in folk tales. In a story from the oral folk literature of the Toba people of northern Argentina, a man has intercourse with a female donkey. One of the four different figures in Arab folktales believed to have been created by the sex of humans and animals is the "Son of the Donkey", who is believed to have been born from the mating of a donkey and a woman.

In an Omani folktale, after the witch kills her older daughter, she prepares her younger daughter to have sex with the demon in the form of a donkey. During the preparation, the mother witch removes her daughter's clothes and encourages her to remain silent while the donkey rapes her daughter. If the daughter utters the name of God or says, "In the name of God I am free from Satan," while having sex with the donkey, the donkey will disappear. However, if the girl's mother or father asks the donkey to return, the donkey comes back and continues to have sex with the girl. The sex continues until the donkey has an orgasm. When the donkey orgasms, the girl turns into a witch.

In a humorous folk tale known in Somalia, a 6-year-old boy discovers his mother having sex with a house guest. When he went to tell his father what he had seen, he saw his father having sex with a female donkey. He then decides not to disturb his father and returns home.

A folktale in the literary tradition of Buddhists in Sri Lanka has a story in which a king and a female donkey are likely to have had sex. In one of the stories about the origins of the Haadiiwo caste in southern Ethiopia, Bushshee's servant had sex with a female donkey, who became pregnant and gave birth to a human being named Hade, the ancestor of all Haadiiwo. In one tale from the Śukasaptati, an ancient collection of Indian stories, a woman vows to kiss an idol of Ganesha if she achieves a particular goal. When she fulfills her promise, the idol mischievously grabs hold of her lips and refuses to let go. Her husband has to make the idol laugh by simulating sex with a donkey to rescue his wife.

The Indian state of Maharashtra is one of the historical sites of donkey curses inscribed on stelae. An ancient Sanskrit curse found at Dabhol in Ratnagiri, written in Sanskrit, means "let the donkey have intercourse with the sinner and the sinner's mother". The Akshi Saka stele dating to 1012 AD (disputed), the Saka stele dating to 1081 and the Sintra stele dating to 1137 are some of the stelae with donkey curses. There is a continuity in the production of these stelae until 1300. The Alu Naka stele dated 1396, the stele of Taj ud-Din Firuz Shah dated 1398, the stele of Deva Raya II dated 1426, the stele of Muhammad Quli Qutb Shah dated 1590, and the stele dated 1652 are some of the stelae found in Maharashtra containing donkey curses.

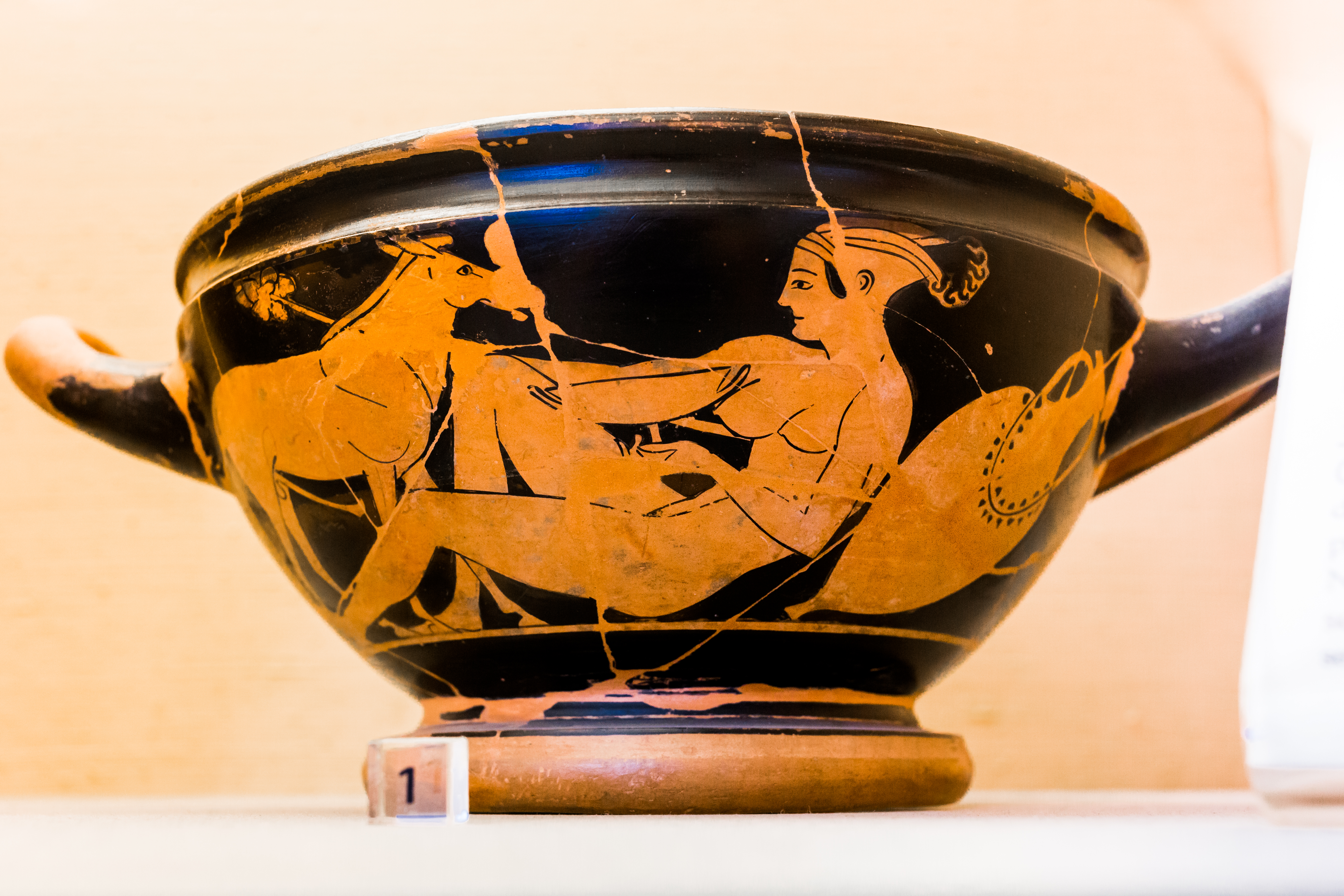
Kantohoros painted by Epiktetos

Sex with donkeys is mentioned in the story of concubines in Rumi's Masnavi. In the work, one of the master's concubines has sex with the donkey in the house. The master's wife sees the concubine having intercourse with the donkey. The master's wife also wants to have sex with the donkey and takes the donkey to the stable. After the master's wife lies under the donkey, the donkey inserts his penis into her vagina. The donkey's penis ruptures her lung and she dies there. In the story, the master's concubine was unharmed because she tied a gourd to the donkey's penis. According to Turkish writer Şefik Can, this story is taken from the book The Golden Ass by the Latin poet Apuleius. In addition to Rumi, in Persian literature between the 10th and 15th centuries, poets such as Sanai, Masud Saʿd Salman, Anvari, Shamsi ʾl-Aʿraj, Qamar and ʿAmʿaq also wrote satirical poems containing references to sexual relations with donkeys.

In the eleventh chapter of the 15th-century sex book The Perfumed Garden by Muhammad ibn Muhammad al-Nefzawi, a woman has sex with a donkey. This chapter is not included in new editions of the book. In the book Dafi al-gumûm wa Rafi al-humûm, an Arab is quoted as saying that having sex with donkeys is better than gambling, and a Turk is quoted as saying that if he were to have sex with donkeys, those who enjoy it should give one or two pieces of gold. In Arabic erotic manuscripts dating from the late Middle Ages, there are passages about women having intercourse with donkeys. In one anecdote, a porter discovers this tendency in his wife.

Sex with donkeys also appears in Nasreddin jokes written in the 16th century. It is thought that at least one fifth of the Nasreddin Hodja jokes written in this period contain obscene content. In one of these jokes, Nasreddin Hodja is caught having sex with a donkey in the mosque. In another anecdote, Nasreddin Hodja shows his donkey to someone and asks him "how can I have intercourse with this weak, poor creature". The man advises him to apply yogurt on his penis and to enter and exit the donkey's vulva. The hodja does as the man says and, by chance, ejaculates. In another joke, Nasreddin Hodja is caught by the donkey's owner while having sex with someone's donkey. When the owner says "what do you think you are doing?", he assures him that what he is doing will not harm the donkey and advises him to protect the donkey from wolves. In another joke, Nasreddin Hodja sunbathes naked after having sex with his donkey, and when someone scolds him, he replies, "Should I cover my wet penis so that it gets moldy?".

Many plays and poems written in the Early modern era feature sexual relations with donkeys. One of the last two plays by Tang Xianzu is the story of Lu Sheng's sexual desire for a female donkey. In A Midsummer Night's Dream, the donkey-bodied character Nick Bottom has sex with Titania, Queen of the Fairies. Jafar Zatalli's satirical poems include references to sexual relations with donkeys. In the satirical poem The Maid of Orleans, Joan of Arc is depicted as an illiterate, illegitimate stable girl who rides a flying donkey and is in constant danger of being sexually assaulted by it. At the end of the poem, the possessed donkey tries to persuade Joan of Arc to have sex. After the donkey comes to his senses, he explains to Joan of Arc that he is possessed and apologizes. Written by Voltaire to undermine the view of Joan of Arc as a heroine, it was banned throughout Europe in the 18th and 19th centuries.

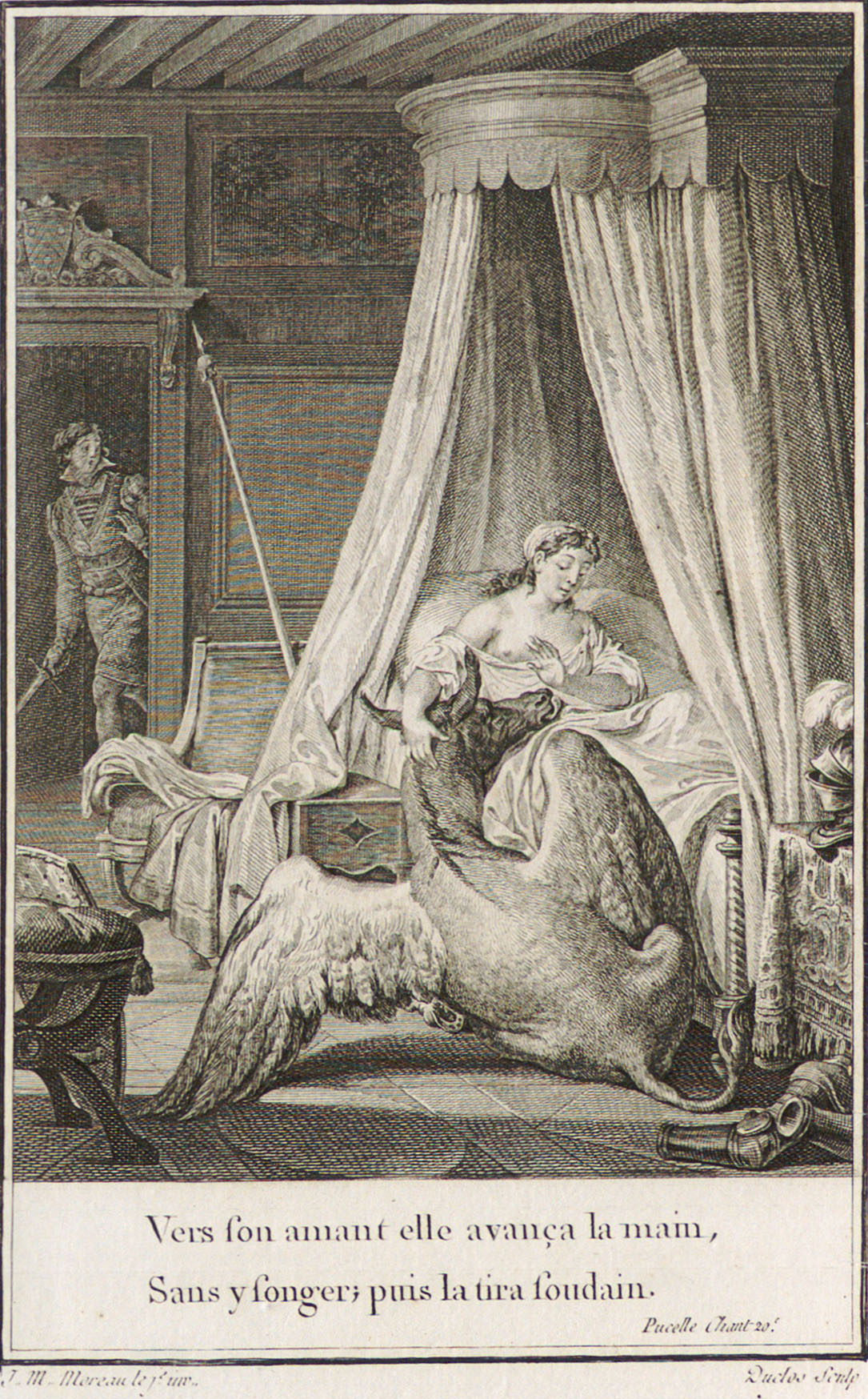
A description from the poem The Maid of Orleans

There are two different Hungarian legends about Maria Theresia's intercourse with a donkey. In the first legend, Queen Maria is insatiable and has sex with a male donkey. Then the courtiers, in order to drive the queen crazy with pleasure, put the queen into a wooden horse, cover the wooden horse with a horsehide, and the male donkey has sex with the queen in a horse costume. In the second legend, Maria Theresia has sex with a male donkey because she is not satisfied with the sexual performance of any of the soldiers. Satisfied with her intercourse with the male donkey, Maria Thereasia tells her men, "I want the gray-coated one again!"

In the 20th century, many books of poetry and novels were published containing references to sex with donkeys. E. E. Cummings' erotic poems, in which "the donkey stares into Muhammad's eyes", refer to Arab cases of bestiality, suggesting that the Qur'an should be ignored. In Le Diable au corps, one of the female characters has sex with a donkey. Gerard Reve became famous after the work in which God, depicted as a mouse-gray donkey, makes love to a visitor to God's house. Reve was put on trial for blasphemy in 1966. In April 1968, the Court of Cassation acquitted Reve as a result of the trial known as the "Donkey Trial". In 2013, blasphemy was decriminalized in the Netherlands. Linda Hogan and Joy Harjo have written erotic poems about horsemen. In the story "My Best Soldier" in Ocean of Words book, a soldier caught having sex with a prostitute is told by his commander to either self-criticize or quit the army. The soldier chooses to do the former in order not to lose his honor. The disciplined soldier does not have sex with the prostitute for months. One day the commander catches the soldier having sex with a mule. In Jaime Manrique's 1982 novel Latin Moon in Manhattan, a character named Sammy is taken by his uncle to a donkey for his first sex. While his uncle has sex with the donkey, Sammy gets excited by focusing on his uncle's large penis and realizes that he is in fact gay. Turkish writer Orhan Kemal's novel Cemile tells the story of a group of people in Adana who see themselves as urbanites and humiliate the field workers who come to the brothel by deeming Nallı Fatma sufficient. In the novel One Hundred Years of Solitude, the character Petronio says, "Corrupt Christians who do business with female donkeys", a reference to sex with donkeys. Selim, the main character of Yusuf Atılgan's novel Canistan, has sex with Tokuç Ali, the son of the agha. Selim is offended by Tokuç Ali's sex with the donkey on the farm before him and leaves Tokuç Ali's farm because he feels that he is considered worthless. Selim, who does not forget what was done to him until his death, raids Tokuç Ali's house with his gang to take revenge years later. The relationship between the male and the female donkey is depicted in Sevgi Soysal's book Yürümek. The book was banned in Turkey in 1973 on the grounds that it violated the crime of "obscene publications", and the author was arrested but later acquitted. There is also an article about sex with donkeys in Atıf Yılmaz's novel Söylemek Güzeldir. In Dario Fo's play Lucio and the Donkey, a man trying to increase his sexual potency drinks the wrong potion and ends up transformed into a donkey, who will be constantly sexually aroused. After the donkey is sold to the circus, he is rented to an aristocratic woman for sexual purposes. Later he works as a sex worker with a slave woman in the circus. He eventually finds the antidote to his metamorphosis and changes back to his human form. He then seeks out the woman he had sex as a donkey, but she rejects him.

In the fairy tale Naughty Boy by Turkish writer Mehmet Tuğrul, a boy threatens his father by slandering him for having sex with a donkey. In the story Kerdız in Turkish writer Muharrem Erbey's book Kayıp Şecere, a young man named Faruk loses his sanity after his father catches him trying to have sex with the donkey he stole. In Turkish writer Erhan Bener's novel Böcek, the character Recai is caught by his uncle while trying to have intercourse with a donkey with two friends and is severely beaten.

In the 21st century, literary works containing references to sex with donkeys have also been written. The character Madoobe in Nuruddin Farah's novel Secrets had a habit of having sex with cows, chickens and ostriches. When Madoobe tried to have sex with a female donkey, he was kicked to death. He was later found naked, lying on his back with his penis partially erect. In the Moroccan story Liefde onder de olijfboom in Hafid Bouazza's novel De voeten van Abdullah, three young men who set out for their village with the dream of relieving their sexual urges by having sex with a donkey fall asleep under an olive tree, dreaming of the pleasure they would feel if the donkey were female. In the book Life and Death Are Wearing Me Out, a character named Chen Guangdi is accused of having sex with a donkey and impregnating it. A girl named Leoni, one of the characters in Graham Hancock's Entangled, angry with her mother, draws a cartoon in her sketchbook with a magic marker of her mother being mounted by a donkey.

In his column in the December 9, 2004 issue of Milliyet newspaper, Çetin Altan described how to have sex with a donkey. In his description, he writes that first the donkey is climbed on a brick, then a weight is tied to the donkey's tail, the weight is thrown on the donkey's back, a mirror is used to check whether anyone is coming or going, and since the donkey cannot be kissed during orgasm, the apple is bitten.

== Religion and mythology ==
In Greek mythology, the onocentaur, a character with a human upper body and a donkey lower body, is believed to have been born from the union of man and donkey.

It is written that Balaam had sex with his donkey. An anecdote about a man having sex with a donkey was used by Zoroastrians in the 9th century to make a complex point about the problem of evil in Islam and Christianity: "A man is seen having sex with a donkey. Those who see him ask why he is doing such an abominable thing. The man replies, 'because it is my donkey'." This anecdote was used to mock the view that God, as the absolute ruler of the universe, cannot be accused of harming/punishing the creatures of the universe.

The Matsya Purana enjoins that anyone who has sex with a donkey should have his head completely shaved. References to sex with the female donkey appear in Parashara's writings. According to the Parasara Dharma Sastra, a person in union with a female animal, including a female donkey, must perform the Prajapatya ritual.

Here is a saying of Muhammad, as recorded in the hadith collections of Abu Dawud, Al-Tirmidhi, and al-Nasa'i:

"A man caught having sex with a female donkey must be killed along with the donkey."

According to Ruhollah Khomeini's decree, if a Muslim man decides to sell a donkey with which he has had sex, he is forbidden to sell it in his home country. According to the book Radd al-Mukhtar, if a woman inserts the penis of a donkey or a severed penis into her body during Hajj, her Hajj is invalid according to the universal consensus.

== Popular culture ==
Eveready Harton in Buried Treasure, which features Bestiality with a donkey

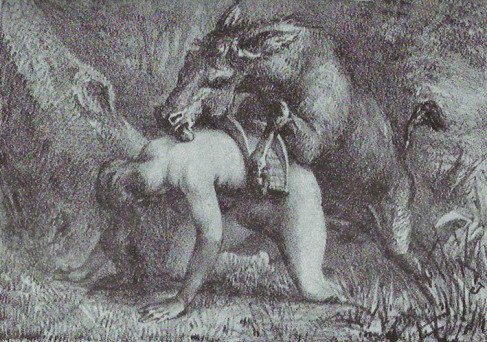
Nude female with donkey, painting of Martin Van Maele

In the cartoon Eveready Harton in Buried Treasure, two men have sex with a donkey. In the 1959 Turkish film Tütün Zamanı, based on the novel of the same name, in the scene where Bekir takes the photograph of Zeliş, the woman he is in love with, and goes to the barn with his donkey, the director hints at a zoophilic relationship, but there is no such scene in the novel. In the 1970s, it became common for women to have sex with donkeys and similar animals in pornographic films. In the same period, it became relatively more acceptable to include jokes about sex with donkeys in humorous films, dramas and magazines. Animal Lover, a porn movie starring Bodil Joensen, was released in New York in 1973. Playing for a year in mini theaters, Animal Lover was the first feature-length film about bestiality and featured Joensen having sex with a dog, a donkey and a pig. In the movie Padre Padrone, Sardinians have their first sexual experiences with farm animals. In the movie, the shepherd is seen having sex with his donkey, sheep and chickens. In the movie Quando l'amore è oscenità, a farmer hires a prostitute to have sex with his donkey. In the 1986 Turkish film Fatmagül'ün Suçu Ne?, Kerim and his friends try to have sex with a donkey before raping the female character Fatmagül. Stanley Beckford's Donkey Man, released in 1993, is a humorous song about a man caught having sex with a donkey. In the opening scene of the 1998 Italian film Toto Who Lived Twice, the audience, after watching a scene in the theater about a man having sex with a donkey, engages in synchronized masturbation in the cinema's toilet after the scene ends. In the pornography film Border Trash, Alaura Eden refuses a policeman's offer of sex, saying that she would rather have sex with a donkey than with him. The scene in the 'Donkey Ass' video, in which a half-naked and panicked man in a field is first chased and then mounted by a donkey with sexual intentions, has become popular on the internet.

The closing credits of the 2007 version of The Heartbreak Kid show a female character having sex with a donkey. The 2007 short documentary Asses of the Caribbean is about men who have sex with donkeys on a daily basis because ultra-religious women do not want to have sex before marriage. In the canceled Kazakh dark comedy My Brother, Borat, the director shot a scene in which the character Bilo is raped by a donkey. Donkey Love, a documentary film about Colombian men's relationship with donkeys, was released in 2012. In the second episode of the Colombian special series of the car program The Grand Tour, a scene of sex with a donkey is seen. A lawsuit was filed against seven people claiming that a scene in the Turkish cartoon Maysa and Bulut depicts "sexual abuse of a donkey".
