= Donkey show =

Sex show portraying bestiality

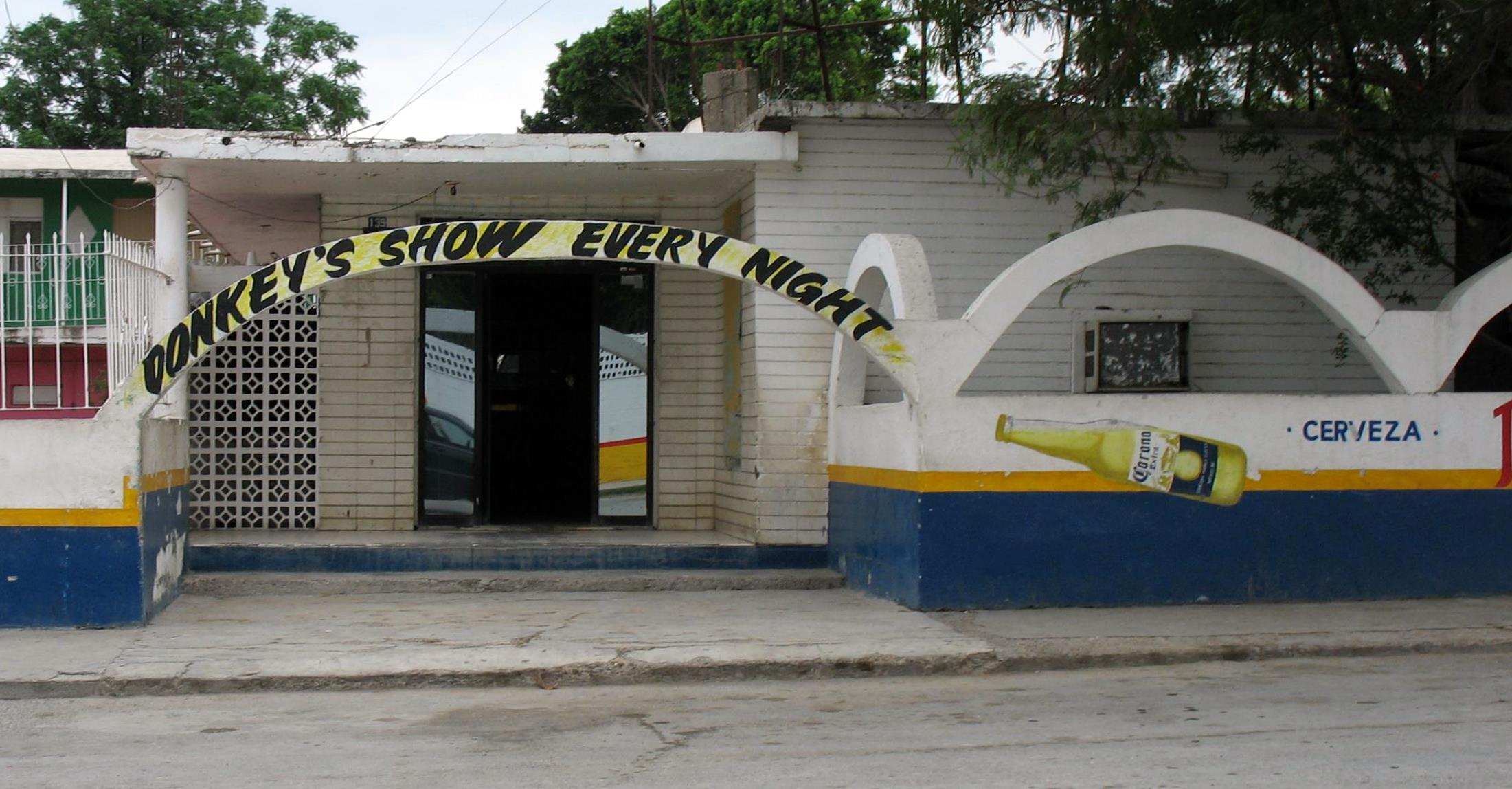
A bar in Boy's Town, Nuevo Laredo, Mexico advertising a nightly "donkey's show"

A donkey show is a type of live sex show in which a woman engages in bestiality with a donkey, which, according to urban legend, some works of fiction, and several eyewitness reports, were once performed in the Mexican border city of Tijuana, particularly in the mid-20th century.

Gustavo Arellano, in his Ask a Mexican column, argues that such donkey shows are not real, although he cites several places where both patrons and workers state unequivocally that such events happened..

As late as 2008, they have been mentioned as a reason to visit Tijuana, and some tourists may seek them out.

In 2005, the term "donkey show" was claimed to be used to describe a situation that has become a "complete mess" such as the government or the news media.

== See also ==
- Ping pong show
