= America's Sweethearts =

2001 comedy film directed by Joe Roth

- Theatrical release poster
- Directed by: Joe Roth
- Written by: Billy Crystal; Peter Tolan
- Produced by: Susan Arnold; Billy Crystal; Donna Arkoff Roth
- Starring: Julia Roberts; Billy Crystal; Catherine Zeta-Jones; John Cusack; Hank Azaria; Stanley Tucci; Christopher Walken; Seth Green
- Cinematography: Phedon Papamichael Jr.
- Edited by: Stephen A. Rotter
- Music by: James Newton Howard
- Production companies: Columbia Pictures; Revolution Studios; Face Productions; Roth-Arnold Productions; Shoelace Productions
- Distributed by: Sony Pictures Releasing
- Release date: July 20, 2001
- Running time: 103 minutes
- Country: United States
- Language: English
- Budget: $46 million
- Box office: $138.3 million

America's Sweethearts is a 2001 American romantic comedy film directed by Joe Roth and written by Billy Crystal and Peter Tolan. It stars Julia Roberts, Crystal, Catherine Zeta-Jones, and John Cusack, with Hank Azaria, Stanley Tucci, Seth Green, Alan Arkin, and Christopher Walken in supporting roles. The film was released by Sony Pictures Releasing on July 20, 2001 to mixed to negative reviews, and was a moderate box office success by grossing $138.3 million against a $46 million budget.

== Plot ==
Veteran publicist Lee Phillips is fired from his position at a major film studio. Studio head Dave Kingman later invites him back for a private screening of Time Over Time, a new time travel thriller starring Gwen Harrison and Eddie Thomas. Eddie and Gwen were a beloved husband-and-wife team dubbed "America's Sweethearts" whose marriage fell apart when Gwen had an affair with her co-star Hector, causing Eddie to suffer a mental breakdown and check into a remote New Age wellness retreat.

When Lee arrives, Kingman reveals he has nothing to screen: the movie's director, Hal Weidmann, is refusing to release the completed film, insisting on premiering it at the upcoming press junket. Kingman is desperate to get hold of it, as the studio has recently suffered a string of flops and Time Over Time is likely the couple's last film together. Unsure when, or even if, the film will arrive, Kingman begs Lee to promote it at the junket by convincing the press that Eddie and Gwen are back together, promising to restore Lee's job if he succeeds. Lee recruits rookie publicist Danny to assist him.

Lee visits Gwen, who now resides with Hector, to persuade her to attend the junket. Kiki, Gwen's sister and personal assistant, convinces her that a junket appearance will help her floundering career and public image. At the wellness retreat, Lee bribes its spiritual guru with a luxury car to convince a reluctant Eddie to face Gwen.

At the junket, Gwen cozies up to Eddie for the press, while behind the scenes their interactions remain tense. Eddie pines for her initially but soon tires of her duplicitous nature. Gwen uses Kiki as her go-between with Eddie, unaware she has feelings for him. To distract the press until the film arrives, Lee and Danny plant clues that Eddie and Gwen have reconciled. After Lee leaks a misleading photo of them to the media, Hector shows up and confronts Eddie, leading to a fistfight that ends when Hector knocks him out with a serving tray. Kingman is thrilled with the publicity, but a guilt-ridden Lee starts to question his tactics.

Kiki helps Eddie to his room, where they give into their growing attraction and have sex. However, at Gwen's cottage the next morning, Eddie tells Gwen he is "not technically" seeing anyone, causing Kiki to storm off in disgust. Eddie goes after Kiki, who lambastes him for his inability to move on from Gwen. Kiki later laments to Lee about a lifetime of coming second to Gwen, while Eddie has an epiphany and realizes Kiki is who he truly wants. Lee, deducing that Eddie and Kiki are in love, encourages him not to give up, but just then, Weidmann arrives in a helicopter to deliver the film.

At the screening, Weidmann shocks everyone by revealing that he abandoned the original script and used hidden camera footage, without the actors' knowledge, to create a "reality movie" instead. The new film follows Gwen's affair with Hector and Eddie's resulting mental decline; highlights include Gwen's demanding behavior on set, Kingman being insulted by his assistant, and Gwen mocking Hector's penis size. Gwen and Kingman confront Weidmann, who defends his artistic vision, while Hector assures the crowd that he is well-endowed (which Weidmann's daughter is happy to confirm). Desperate, Gwen announces that she and Eddie are getting back together, but he rebuffs her and publicly declares his love for Kiki. Kiki decides to stop putting her sister's desires ahead of her own, and a humiliated Gwen fires her and flounces off. Kiki and Eddie then kiss as the audience applauds.

In the aftermath, Weidmann's movie becomes a hit, and Lee resumes his studio job to promote it. Gwen admits to the press that the reconciliation was a lie, blaming her erratic behavior on pain medication before departing with Hector. Eddie and Kiki decide to pursue a relationship, and politely ignoring Lee's request to join his promotion efforts, they leave together to travel.

== Cast ==
- Julia Roberts as Kiki Harrison
- Billy Crystal as Lee Phillips
- Catherine Zeta-Jones as Gwen Harrison
- John Cusack as Eddie Thomas
- Hank Azaria as Hector Gorzongolas
- Stanley Tucci as Dave Kingman
- Christopher Walken as Hal Weidmann
- Alan Arkin as Wellness guide
- Seth Green as Danny Wax

In addition, Larry King and Byron Allen have cameo appearances as themselves, while Julia Roberts' niece, Emma, makes an uncredited appearance as the young girl in the purple T-shirt.

== Production ==
Robert Downey Jr. was originally cast as Eddie, but was replaced in December 2000 due to his drug related arrest the month prior.

== Release ==
=== Box office ===
America's Sweethearts opened on July 20, 2001, and earned $30,181,877 in its opening weekend, ranking second behind Jurassic Park III ($50,771,645). By the end of its run, the film had grossed $93,607,673 in the domestic box office and $44,583,755 overseas for a worldwide total of $138,191,428. Based on a $46 million budget, the film was a box office success. Filming took place at Lake Las Vegas.

=== Critical response ===
Despite being a box office success, America's Sweethearts holds a 33% approval rating at Rotten Tomatoes from 147 critics. The site's consensus states: "Despite its famous cast, the movie lacks sympathetic characters and is only funny in spurts." On Metacritic, the film holds a 44 out of 100 ratings based on 32 reviews, indicating "mixed or average" reviews. Audiences polled by CinemaScore gave the film an average grade of "B" on an A+ to F scale. Gustavo Arellano in his writing ¡Ask a Mexican! identified Azaria's character Hector as an example of the Latin lover stereotype.
