= The Donkey Show =

The Donkey Show can refer to:

- The Donkey Show (musical), a disco version of Midsummer Night's Dream
- The Donkey Show (radio program), a radio show on KFLY-FM (Eugene) and 106.3 KZZE (Rogue Valley), Oregon

== See also ==
- Donkey show, a semi-fictitious sex show found in Tijuana, Mexico
