= Ping pong show =

Stage entertainment in south-east Asia

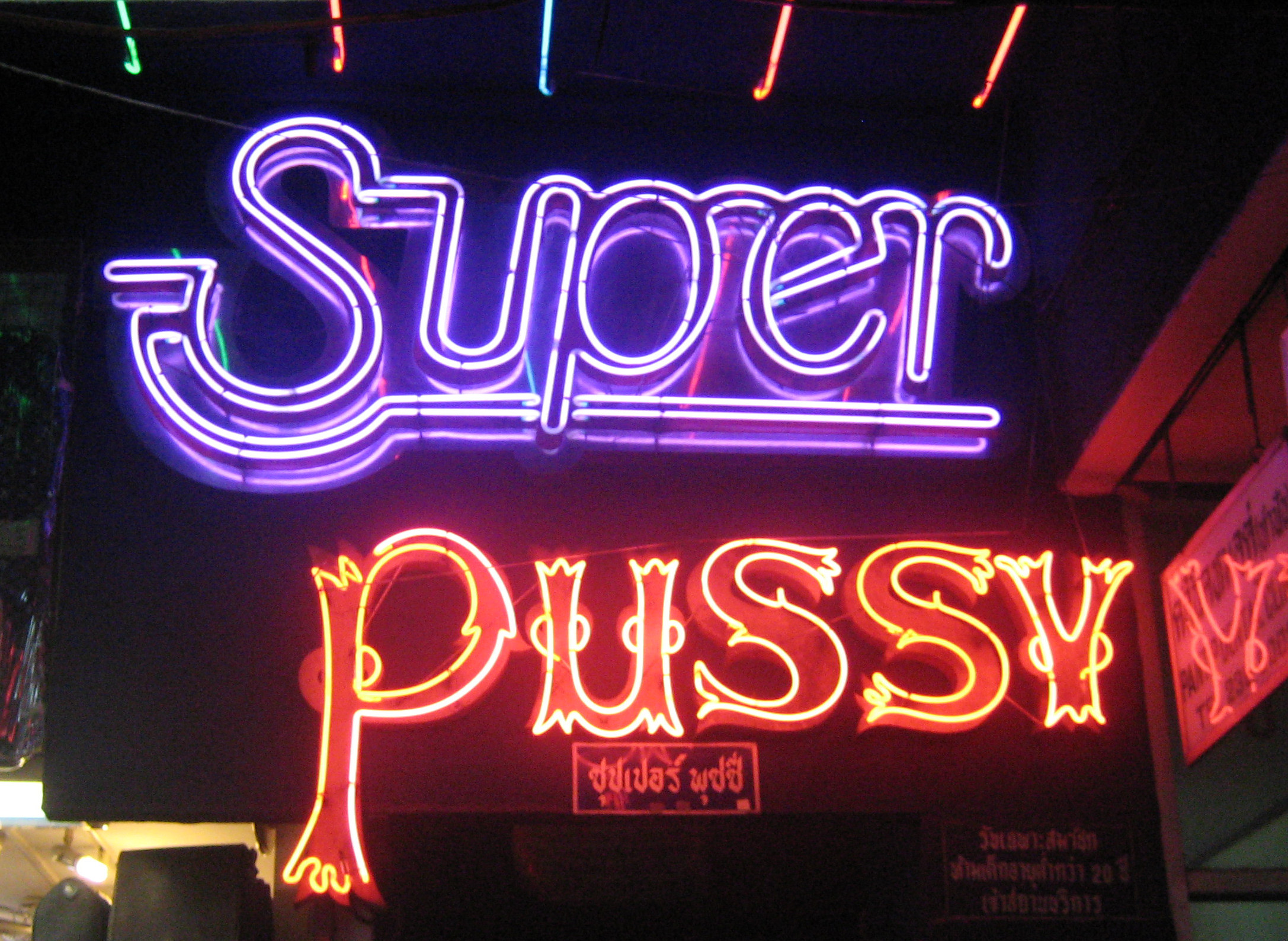
Neon sign outside the Super Pussy bar in Patpong district in Bangkok, which features a ping pong show.

A ping pong show (Thai: โชว์ปิงปอง) is a form of stage entertainment that takes place in strip clubs. It is a type of sex show in which women use their pelvic muscles to either hold, eject, or blow objects from their vaginal cavity. Ping pong balls are the most iconic objects used. The show has been popular in Southeast Asia (particularly Bangkok, Phuket and Pattaya,Thailand) for several decades, and is primarily performed for foreign tourists. The show is in many cases associated with sex tourism and human rights concerns have been raised regarding the performers.

== Description ==
The show typically takes place on a stage or dance platform and often involves a single performer. Usually she performs while lying on her back, although some variations involve a standing performer. The performer is commonly bottomless, dressed only in a bikini top or bra and with her pubic hair shaven. Items can be inserted into the vagina either on stage as part of the performance or beforehand in preparation. As an alternative to ejecting the items using the pelvic muscles, objects are sometimes pulled out by hand. The earliest versions of the show involved ping pong balls, but other diverse objects have since been used in the performance. They include eggs, bananas, long strings or ribbons, whistles, horns, pens, cigarettes, candles, darts, spinning tops, bottles, firecrackers, razor blades, eels and chopsticks. Another activity is the shooting of goldfish into a bowl, or stuffing a large frog inside to see how long she can keep it in. A male member of the audience may be brought onto the dance platform to hold a balloon while a dart is shot at it, or the performer may do a shoot around the table at balloons tied to each customer's chair. Another example of audience participation involves the performer filling her vagina with beer, expelling it into a glass and inviting an audience member to drink it.

== In Thailand ==
The popularity of ping pong shows in Thailand dates back to the mid 1970s and a show is featured in the 1976 sexploitation film Emanuelle in Bangkok. The shows are officially prohibited under the obscenity legislation of Thai law, and in 2004 the government further limited what is permitted. Nevertheless, demand from foreign tourists and local police corruption usually results in the practice being implicitly condoned by Thai officials. There are instances of women performing at ping pong shows also working as prostitutes, but in many ping pong show bars performers do not sell sex to customers. Although prostitution in Thailand is not strictly illegal, publicly soliciting and creating a nuisance is.

The focus of most live sex shows in Thailand is on feats of the vagina. Stage shows featuring penetrative sex between men and women only happen very occasionally in the country, in contrast to sex shows in cities such as Amsterdam. There are numerous venues hosting ping-pong shows in several Thai cities. In the 2010s, they were found in Patpong in Bangkok, Walking Street, Pattaya, Bangla Road in Phuket and Ta Pae Gate in Chiang Mai. Customers are brought in by employees working for the ping-pong shows. They approach tourists and passers-by in streets such as Bangkok's Khaosan Road during the late evening and ask them if they want to see a show. They are frequently shown pictures of the show in a booklet. The shows take place on the upper floors of bars and strip clubs in locations such as Bangkok's entertainment district Patpong, while bikini-clad women dance in the ground floor bars. An entry fee is usually charged, often equivalent to around US$10, though typically nearer US$20 in Bangkok. In some cases, instead of a cover charge, the drinks are priced 3–4 times higher than usual and a purchase is required. It is the sale of drinks that is the primary source of income for many of these sexualised venues. Other possible charges can include show fees and exit charges. In addition, performers often go around asking for tips after they have finished their acts.

== In Laos ==
The Laotian capital Vientiane was once famous for its brothels and ping-pong-show bars during the 1960s and 1970s as a result of the country's involvement in the Vietnam War. Travel writer Paul Theroux described a bar in 1973 Vientiane thus: “Your eyes get accustomed to the dark and you see the waitress is naked. Without warning she jumps on the chair, pokes a cigarette into her vagina and lights it, puffing it by contracting her uterine lungs." British journalist Christopher Robbins wrote that The White Rose, a famous Vientiane bar during the war, featured floor shows in which women used their vaginas to smoke cigarettes and fling ping pong balls. Such shows have since disappeared and brothels are now prohibited by Laotian law.

== In Europe ==
In the red light district of De Wallen in Amsterdam the Moulin Rouge and Casa Rosso theatres feature on-stage sex shows including variations on the ping pong show. The acts performed include writing with a pen held inside the vagina and pulling long pieces of string out of the vagina.

== Human rights concerns ==
The ping pong show is designed to get people talking about it so that people will come to the bar to see it. Often customers come only to see the show and leave when it is over. This is good business for the bar, which makes much of its profits from drinks. However, the majority of the bar workers do not participate in the show. Research published in 2002 indicated that most bar workers regard the show as bad for business and do not like it. Many bar workers consider the show to be low-class and in bad taste, boring as it is the same every night, and liable to take attention away from the bar workers by focusing on the acts.

An article in 2009 described an example of the working conditions of women at ping pong shows. The employees arrived at 18:00 and left at daybreak. They stamped a time card and were penalized 5 baht (US$0.14) for every minute they were late. Each month, they received two nights of leave and, if they did not miss any additional nights, they earned a salary of 6,000 baht (US$181), supplemented by tips. In 2015 the average monthly income in Thailand was $489, according to the International Labour Organization.

Some human rights organizations (such as Not For Sale) have denounced ping pong shows as inherently misogynistic. Taina Bien-Aimé of Equality Now commented that: "The attitude that [sex work in places like ping pong shows] is empowering gives a green light to traffickers. We're trying to fight the commercial sex trade, not empower the sex trade." Some of the performers in ping pong shows in Thailand come from poorer neighbouring countries such as Myanmar, Cambodia, or Laos. The closure of factories in Thailand during the Great Recession in the late 2000s led to an increase in unemployment in the country. Some women formerly engaged in factory work moved to Thailand's red-light districts and ended up working in ping pong shows. Bien-Aime commented: "Working 14 hours [a day] in a factory or blowing ping pong balls out of your vagina should not be a person's only choices in life." Although no pain or suffering is generally experienced by female performers during the show, there have been rare accidents in which performers have been seriously and irreparably injured. The inclusion of a ping pong show scene in the film The Adventures of Priscilla, Queen of the Desert led to the film being criticised on the grounds of sexism and racism.

== See also ==
- Donkey show
- Prostitution in Laos
