= My Brother, Borat =

- Directed by: Erkin Rakishev
- Screenplay by: Erkin Rakishev
- Starring: Roman Khikalov
- Country: Kazakhstan

My Brother, Borat was a planned Kazakh dark comedy film, an unauthorised sequel to the 2006 film Borat: Cultural Learnings of America for Make Benefit Glorious Nation of Kazakhstan. The film was written and directed by Erkin Rakishev, and it was meant to address mis-conceptions of Kazakhstan as portrayed in the 2006 film. The film was scheduled for release in early 2011. Because there hasn't been any update on the film since 2010, it is likely that the production for My Brother, Borat has been cancelled.

== Synopsis ==
My Brother, Borat tells the story of John, an American journalist who, after watching the film Borat, decides to visit Kazakhstan. He ends up meeting Bilo—Borat Sagdiyev's mentally-ill younger brother. The two go to find Borat's fictional home village of Kusek. They discover it to be a modern and well-developed city in another country.

== Background ==
Director Erkin Rakishev did not see the humour intended by the 2006 Borat film, and so decided to create My Brother, Borat as a counterbalance to correct the image of Kazakhstan as a backward country. He stated, "I think it crossed the line. Maybe they just wanted to joke, but they belittled, insulted and mixed us with dirt, they compared us to animals, showed us as barbarians and wild people". Rakishev explained that the Borat film offended the Kazakhstan government to the point of the film being banned in that country. In wishing to address the negative perceptions of Kazakhstan created in the original film, he developed My Brother, Borat as an "image-redressing movie". He began initial production on the film after Borat was released in 2006, and abandoned the project due to lack of financing, only recently being able to continue the project, with the assistance of Kazakhstan legislator Bekbolat Tleukhan.

Rakishev did shoot controversial scenes, such as one in which the character of Bilo is raped by a donkey and another where an old woman is beating the two main characters with a stick. In denying that such scenes would offend, Rakishev stated, "If it was Borat's brother who raped the donkey then perhaps it would be considered outrageous, but it is the other way round". The director explained that "he would not mind distributing the film in the United States, though there was the matter of possible copyright violation". He has stated that he would welcome a lawsuit, as it would both provide publicity and promote his vision of a proud Kazakhstan.
