= The Good Old Naughty Days =

Polissons et galipettes
- Cover of US DVD
- Directed by: Michel Reilhac
- Release date: 20 May 2002 (Cannes Film Festival)
- Running time: 69 minutes
- Country: France
- Language: French

The Good Old Naughty Days (French: Polissons et galipettes, lit. 'Rascals and somersaults') is a compilation from over 300 recently discovered film clips from silent hardcore pornographic films made between 1905 and 1930, re-edited by director Michel Reilhac, released in 2002, with a new soundtrack by Eric Le Guen. Most of the films were made in France and were intended to be shown in brothels. The collection also includes a pornographic animation from the United States, Eveready Harton in Buried Treasure, made by unknown artists in or around 1928 and never theatrically released before.

Themes covered include pornographic adaptations of classics such as Madame Butterfly, precursors of pornography clichés such as the encounter between the "musketeer" and the milkmaid, stock characters such as lascivious nuns and priests, and footage showing bestiality (sexual acts with non-human animals), which according to the film-maker Michel Reilhac shows that "the modern porn industry did not invent anything – everything had already been filmed by our great-grandparents."

At the time of its release (2003) it was the first R18 film to be rated for display in cinemas in the United Kingdom for over ten years, despite its contents, partly due to its 'classic' style and age and as "historical footage".

== List of films ==
Films with clips included:

- Combing her hair (1905)
- L'atelier faiminette (1921)
- Mr. Abbott Bitt at convent (1925)
- La fesseé à l'école = School of spanking (1925)
- Mousquetaire au restaurant = Musketeer's dinner (1920)
- La voyeuse = The voyeur (1924)
- Miss Butterfly (1925)
- Agenor fait un levage = Agenor is picking up (1925)
- Homework (1920)
- Teatime (1925)
- Massages (1930)
- Buried treasure (1925)
