= Prostitution in Laos =

Decriminalization – No criminal penalties for prostitution Legalization – prostitution legal and regulated Abolitionism – prostitution is legal, but organized activities such as brothels and pimping are illegal; prostitution is not regulated Neo-abolitionism illegal to buy sex and for 3rd party involvement, legal to sell sex Prohibitionism – prostitution illegal Legality varies with local laws

Prostitution in Laos is regarded as a criminal activity and can be subject to severe prosecution. It is much less common than in neighbouring Thailand. Soliciting for prostitution takes place mainly in the city's bars and clubs, although street prostitution also takes place. The visibility of prostitution in Laos belies the practice's illegality. As of 2016, UNAIDS estimates there to be 13,400 prostitutes in the country.

Most prostitutes in Laos are from poor rural Laotian families and the country's ethnic minorities. In addition to these, there are many prostitutes in Laos from China and Vietnam, while some Laotian women go to Thailand to work as sex workers. Laos has been identified as a source country for women and girls trafficked for commercial sexual exploitation in Thailand.

Many female sex workers in Laos are at high risk of sexually transmitted infection (STI) and disease. They often have limited access to treatment and services due to cultural sensitivity regarding sexuality and pre-marital sex.

== History ==
The establishment of the French Protectorate of Laos in 1893 resulted in the arrival of French civil servants who took "local wives" while posted in the country. Prostitution increased during the First Indochina War and the Vietnam War as a result of the presence of foreign troops in Laos. At this time prostitutes came from Thailand to work in the nightclubs and bars of the capital city Vientiane. During the 1960s and 1970s the country's involvement in the Vietnam War led to Vientiane becoming famous for its brothels and ping pong show bars. As early as the 1950s, prostitution was discouraged by the Lao government as a social evil. When the Lao People's Democratic Republic was established in 1975, prostitution was criminalised. Brothels were prohibited by law and disappeared from the country. Prostitutes were initially interned in rehabilitation camps called don nang ("women's island"), though this practice was later discontinued. In the 1990s, tourism and nightclubs returned to the country and with them prostitution became evident again.

== Causes ==
Poverty in Laos is a cause of increased prostitution in the country, with the sex industry in neighbouring Thailand attracting sex workers from Laos. Research published in 2012 indicated that sex workers considered the profession to be "an easy and good source of income compared to other jobs". They also said that it had the advantage of being "suitable for a low-educated person because working in a bar does not require formal training or skills and is quickly learned."

== Locations ==
Brothels are prohibited by Lao law. Female sex workers in Laos are often employed as hostesses in places of entertainment, such as beer bars, "drinkshops", karaoke bars, nightclubs, guest houses and restaurants. They serve beer and snacks and provide conversation as well as selling sex. Pimps are sometimes used to find clients. Sexual services are provided in guest houses, hotels, or the client's room, which are usually attached to places of entertainment. Otherwise they tend to take place in remote areas. The country's Golden Triangle Special Economic Zone in Bokeo Province has been called "a mecca of gambling, prostitution and illicit trade".

== The Khmu ==
By 2011, changing socio-economic conditions in rural Laos had resulted in Laotian women from the Khmu ethnic minority becoming predominant at the lower end of the Laotian sex industry. The Khmu are a minority ethnic group that reside mostly in isolated and mountainous areas in the Upper Mekong region of Laos. They are the second largest ethnic group after the lowland Lao and make up more than 10 percent of the 6.2 million population. There are a significant number of Khmu women in northern Laos that are involved in the commercial sex industry. Many of these women voluntarily leave their villages due to the very poor living conditions there. The Khmu women mostly move to border areas around the upper Mekong where there is more infrastructure, including bars, restaurants, and casinos.

== Sexual health ==
Research conducted into female sex workers published in 2011 indicated that while 99 percent of them reported using condoms, 26 percent had had an abortion. Of those who had been pregnant in the last six months, 89.4 percent had had an abortion. Abortions in Laos are not only illegal, but also are generally performed in unsafe conditions by untrained practitioners. In 2016, only 42 percent of all births were attended by skilled health professionals. In 2004, infection rates of chlamydia and gonorrhea were 33 and 18 percent. The Lao government implemented a national strategic and action plan in 2005, aimed at expanding universal access to treatment, support, and care. The primary target groups included female sex workers, mobile populations, and drug users. However, the plan has not had much of an impact due to the quality of STI services being relatively limited in Laos.

=== Cultural issues ===
Access to information and treatment regarding AIDS/HIV/STIs remains limited in Laos due to a conservative culture and sensitivity towards sexuality. Many individuals reported a fear of going to health facilities for treatment due to social discrimination regarding pre-marital sex and "clinicians' negative attitudes towards 'dirty disease'". A general lack of knowledge exists in Laos regarding RTI/STIs. The main sources of information are radio and television. However, access to health information is difficult in rural areas. One study suggested that providers of contraceptive information and supplies are influenced by Lao norms, which disapprove of premarital sex, and stigmatize women who seek contraceptive services.

=== HIV/AIDS ===
In 2004, between 0.8 percent and 4.2 percent of female sex workers in Laos were estimated to be infected with HIV/AIDS. In 2015 the HIV prevalence for the total Laos population was 0.2 percent with 1096 new infections and 128 AIDS related deaths. In 2016, an estimated 4,900 women aged 15 and up were living with HIV.

== Sex trafficking ==
Laos is a source and, to a lesser extent, a transit and destination country for women and children subjected to sex trafficking. Lao trafficking victims, especially from the southern region of the country, are often migrants seeking opportunities abroad who then experience sexual exploitation in destination countries, most often Thailand, as well as Vietnam, Malaysia, China, Taiwan, and Japan. Some migrate with the assistance of brokers charging fees, while others move independently through Laos' 23 official border crossings using valid travel documents. Traffickers take advantage of this migration, and the steady movement of Lao population through the country's 50 unofficial and infrequently-monitored border crossings, to facilitate the trafficking of Lao individuals in neighboring countries. Traffickers in rural communities often lure acquaintances and relatives with false promises of legitimate work opportunities in neighboring countries, then subject them to sex trafficking.

A large number of victims, particularly women and girls, are exploited in Thailand's commercial sex industry. Some number of women and girls from Laos are sold as brides in China and subjected to sex trafficking. Some local officials reportedly contributed to trafficking vulnerabilities by accepting payments to facilitate the immigration of girls to China.

Laos is reportedly a transit country for some Vietnamese and Chinese women and girls who are subjected to sex trafficking in neighboring countries, particularly Thailand. Chinese women and girls are also subjected to sex trafficking within Laos. Most of the women trafficked from China to Laos, Thailand and Malaysia are from ethnic minorities like the Dai ethnicity from areas like the from Xishuangbanna Dai Autonomous Prefecture in Yunnan province and they are trafficked by men of their own ethnicity. The Dai people are related to Thai people.

The United States Department of State Office to Monitor and Combat Trafficking in Persons ranks Laos as a 'Tier 3' country.
