= Eveready Harton in Buried Treasure =

1929 film

- Directed by: E. Hardon
- Running time: 7 minutes
- Country: United States
- Language: English

"Buried Treasure" Featuring Eveready Harton, also known as Eveready Harton in Buried Treasure or Pecker Island, is an American adult animated pornographic cartoon short film made in the United States in 1928 or 1929. It depicts the sexual adventures of Eveready Harton (a pun on "ever-ready hard-on"), whose perpetually aroused, comically oversized penis at times detaches and acts on its own. Over the course of the movie, Eveready has a variety of sexual relations with a woman, a man, a donkey, and a cow. The six-and-a-half-minute silent black-and-white film was produced anonymously, reportedly a joint project by three mainstream studios for a private animation-industry party.

== Plot ==
A title card states that Eveready has escaped "a band of Hoary Amazens [sic]" with "his treasure", ending on a desert island.

Eveready is sleeping and awakens to two flies buzzing around the head of his erect penis. He shoots at them, causing the penis to briefly detach and hide. After re-attaching it, he looks around with binoculars, and spies dogs, snakes, and birds having sex, then a woman masturbating with a dildo. He goes to her, first using a wheel to support his penis, then using it as a third leg.

The woman invites Eveready to fondle her breast. After licking and squeezing it, it squirts milk into his mouth, which he welcomes. Her labia reach out to kiss the head of Eveready's penis. He attempts to penetrate her vagina, but is unable to because it is blocked: he removes an alarm clock and a shoe before he can do so. The penis is suddenly snapped by a crab, and it pulls out and flees, with the crab clinging to it by its claw. Eveready runs after the penis, which finally rids itself of the crab by ejaculating on it, and reattaches itself to him.

Eveready sees a woman covered up to her shoulders by a big pile of sand. He "buries" his penis into the pile of sand, which falls away, revealing that he has actually anally penetrated an old man who was having sex with the woman under the sand. Eveready runs away, but his penis is stuck inside the old man, dragging him along behind. With some effort, he pulls the penis out, then pounds the bent organ back into shape.

Eveready comes to a man having sex with a donkey, and challenges him to a sword fight using their penises. He wins by biting the other man's shaft, which goes limp. The donkey invites Eveready to take over, but jumps out of the way as he leaps to penetrate her, causing him to land on a cactus instead, embedding spines in his penis, which he must extract.

"Discouraged and disheartened", Eveready notices a lumber fence with a cow on the other side of it. He puts his penis through a hole in the fence, and the cow eagerly licks it, to his pleasure.

== History ==
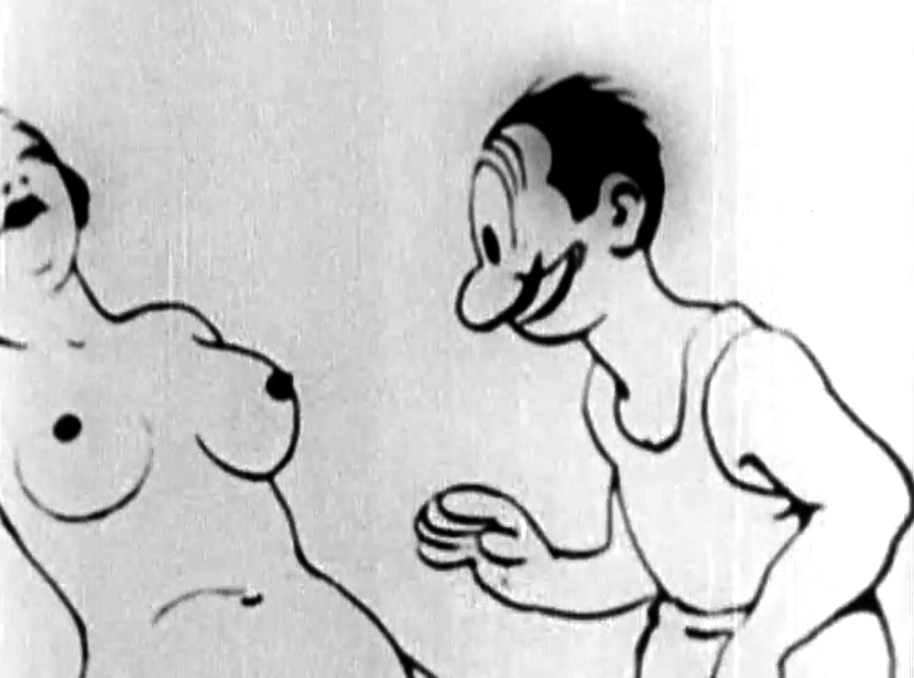
Eveready Harton

According to Karl F. Cohen's 1997 book, Forbidden Animation: Censored Cartoons and Blacklisted Animators in America, rumor held that U.S. film labs refused to process the film, and it had to be developed in Cuba. The artists are unknown, but a widespread rumor states that a group of famous animators created the film for a private party in honor of Winsor McCay. Disney animator Ward Kimball gave the following account of the history of the short:

The first porno-cartoon was made in New York. It was called "Eveready Harton" and was made in the late 1920s, silent, of course—by three studios. Each one did a section of it without telling the other studios what they were doing. Studio A finished the first part and gave the last drawing to Studio B [...] Involved were Max Fleischer, Paul Terry and the Mutt and Jeff studio. They didn't see the finished product till the night of the big show. A couple of guys who were there tell me the laughter almost blew the top off the hotel where they were screening it.

When a copy of the short was screened in San Francisco in the late 1970s, the program notes attributed the animation to George Stallings, George Cannata, Rudy Zamora Sr., and Walter Lantz. The short circulated informally, shown only at small underground festivals or parties, until 2002 when it was included in the theatrically released compilation The Good Old Naughty Days.
