= Walking Street, Pattaya =

Entertainment and red-light district in Pattaya, Thailand

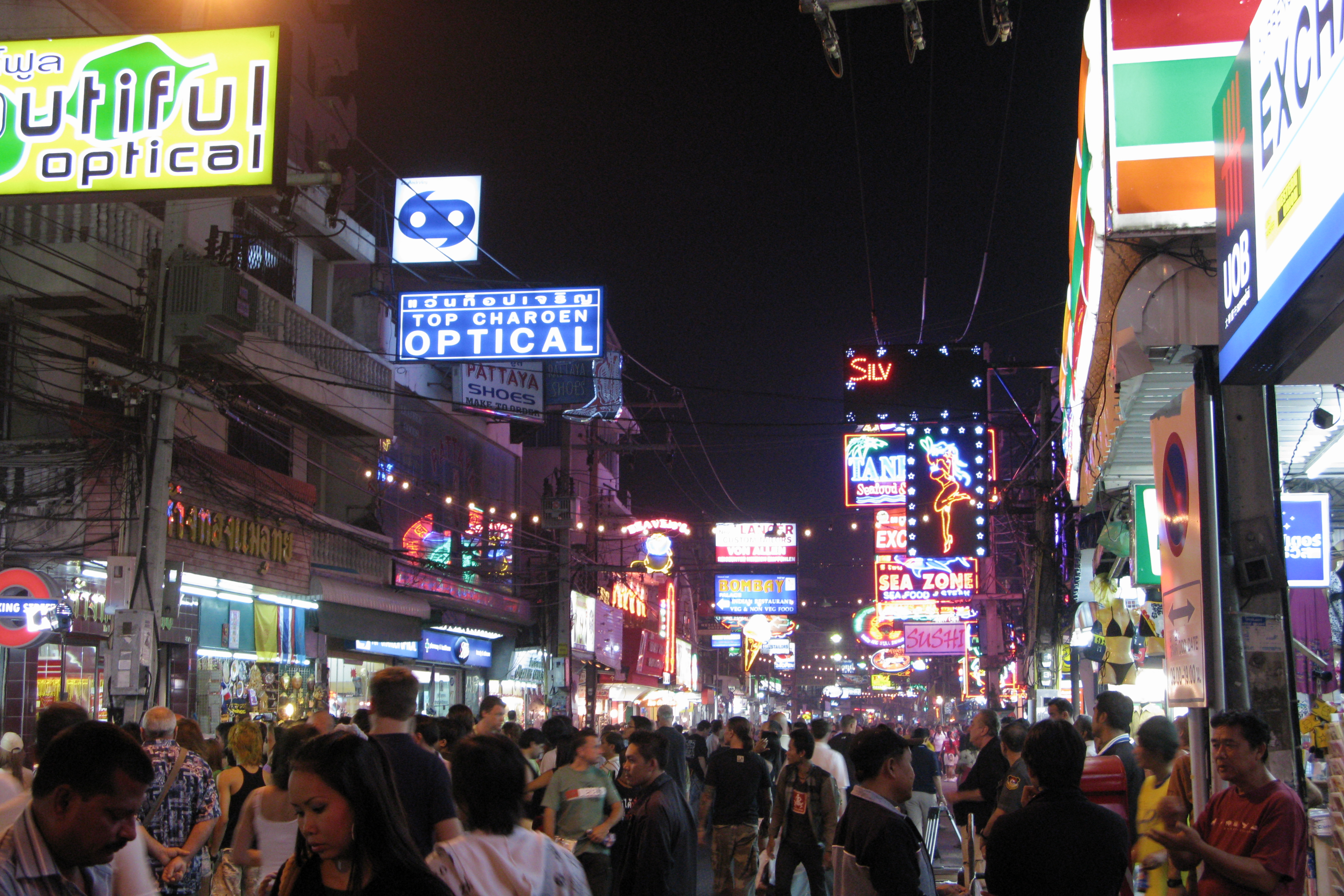
- Interactive map of Walking Street, Pattaya
- Location: Pattaya, Thailand
- Coordinates: 12°55′31.62″N 100°52′16.41″E
- From: Beach Road

Other
- Known for: Entertainment and red-light district

Walking Street (Thai: ถนนคนเดิน) is an entertainment and red-light district in the city of Pattaya, Thailand. The street is a tourist attraction which draws both foreigners and Thai nationals primarily for its night life. The Walking Street area includes seafood restaurants, live music venues, beer bars, discothèques, sports bars, go-go bars, nightclubs and hotels. Tourists are able to watch a variety of sex shows.

The area is closed to vehicles from 19:00 until 03:00. Car and motorcycle parking is provided at the Bali Hai end. Although the closing time of the bars and clubs is officially 04:00, some stay open later illegally.

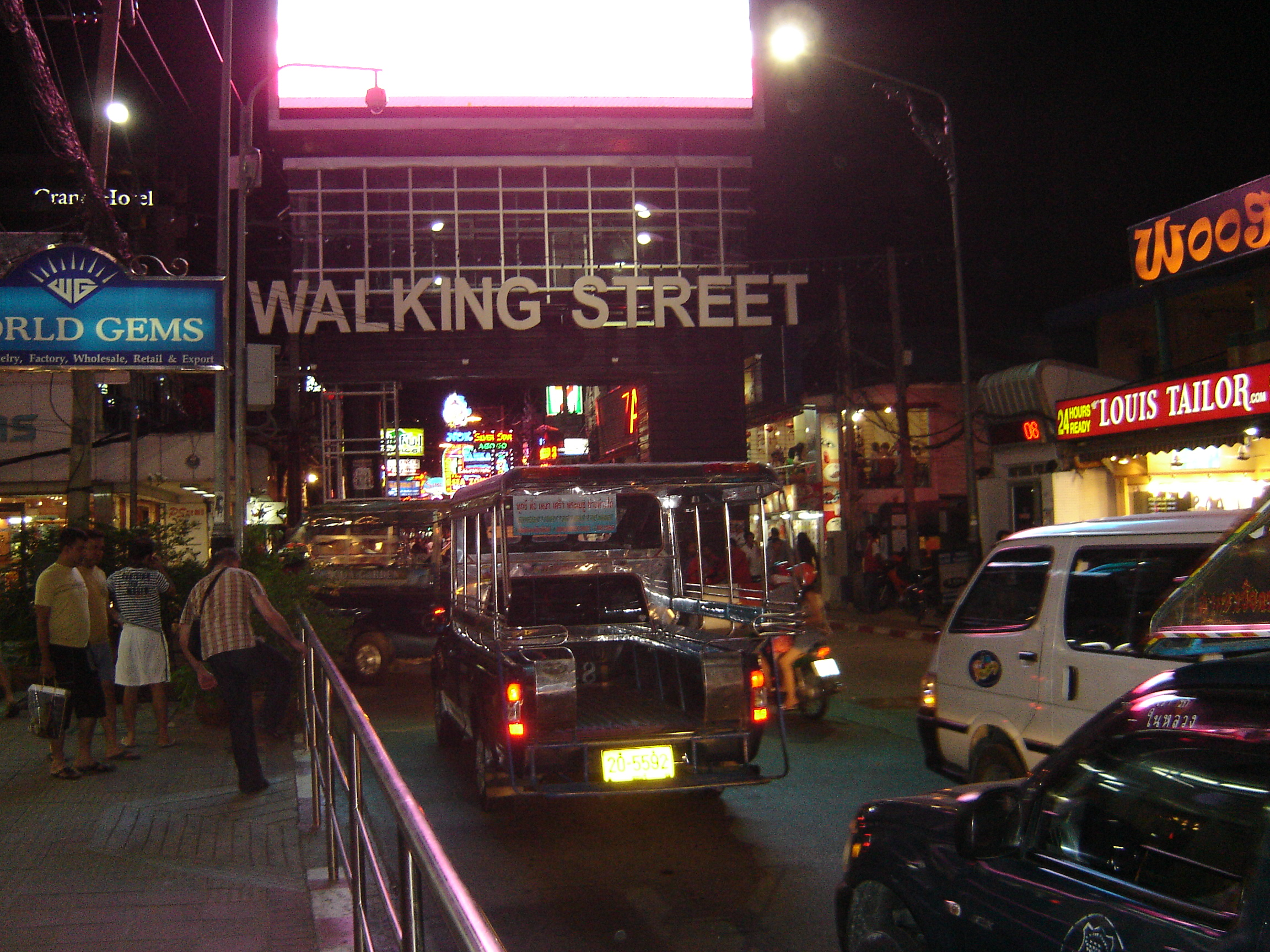
Entrance to Walking Street in 2009

== History ==
Before its establishment, Walking Street was primarily a roadway for Pattaya's fishing industry when it was a fishing village. In the 1960s and 1970s, the area switched to providing services for soldiers from the United States Armed Forces on rest and recuperation breaks in Pattaya, resulting in the development of hotels, bars and restaurants on Walking Street, which was then referred to as "The Strip". During the 1980s, The Strip saw the development of cabaret performances and discotheques. In the 1990s, several car accidents on The Strip led to the Pattaya City council to close the street to vehicles after 6 p.m, leading the area to become known as Walking Street.

A large video sign was erected in March 2010 at the Beach Road entrance. The street has numerous bars, restaurants and attractions which advertise using bright large neon signs. Pattaya authorities began cracking down on oversized signs in 2015 in an effort to improve accessibility on Walking Street for emergency vehicles.

Following the COVID-19 pandemic, the amount of venues oriented towards Westerners decreased and shifted towards other areas in Pattaya, whilst venues oriented towards South Koreans and Russians increased. In 2023, Thailand began seeing a surge in Indian tourists, who were granted visa exemptions from 10 November 2023 to 10 May 2024. This surge led to an increase in the development of Indian-oriented venues in Walking Street.

In 2023, deputy mayor Wuthisak Rermkijakarn made it so street vendors on Walking Street could only sell after 18:30.

On 7 April 2026, the Tourist Police held a meeting on Walking Street with local police, Immigration Bureau officials, and entertainment venue operators in response to viral social media videos showing nightlife venue security guards using excessive force against foreign tourists. Police statistics indicated that most tourist-related incidents in the area between December 2025 and March 2026 had involved assaults, with a notable rise in March, leading to the announcement of stricter regulations on security guards and the introduction of non-violent response training.

== Prostitution ==
In addition to a large number of institutions offering sexual entertainment, a significant number of prostitutes work on the street. Although prostitution in Thailand is illegal, there are estimated to be 27,000 prostitutes working in Pattaya, many in Walking Street.

Many of the prostitutes work as bargirls in the bars and clubs along the street. Their clients are often required to pay a bar fine to take them out of the bar.

In 2016, Thailand's first female Minister of Tourism, Kobkarn Wattanavrangkul, announced that Thailand was "closed to the sex trade" following adverse coverage in foreign media. In Pattaya, the aim was to push prostitution back to beyond Second Street, leaving the areas near the beach a family-friendly tourist area. There have been many police raids and crackdowns, and in 2019 Thai police and government officials declared that there was no prostitution in Walking Street. However, the sex trade there continued and still continues despite these claims.

== Proposed redevelopment ==
Due to efforts in the 2010s through to the 2020s to shift Pattaya away from sex tourism and towards venues which are more family friendly, there have been several ideas by the City Council to redevelop parts or the entirety of Walking Street.

In 1998, 101 buildings on Walking Street were targeted for demolition due to them being seen as encroaching on public land, as shown in a report by Japan International Cooperation Agency. The plan did not go through due to the impact it would have on Pattaya's tourism industry. The issue of these buildings encroaching on public land resurfaced when a royal decree on land expropriation issued on 17 April 2014 confirmed the findings of the 1998 report. In May 2016, Silapakorn University was hired by the City Council to come up with plans to solve the issue of encroachment on public land. A public hearing on 6 October presented four plans which called on the removal of differing amount of buildings on Walking Street.

In May 2015, Deputy Mayor Ronakit Ekasingh ordered the demolition of 12 buildings on Walking Street for illegally extending their property, although only a few were demolished.

On 11 June 2020, several ideas were presented to the City Council to redevelop Walking Street alongside the Bali Hai pier area.

== Gallery ==
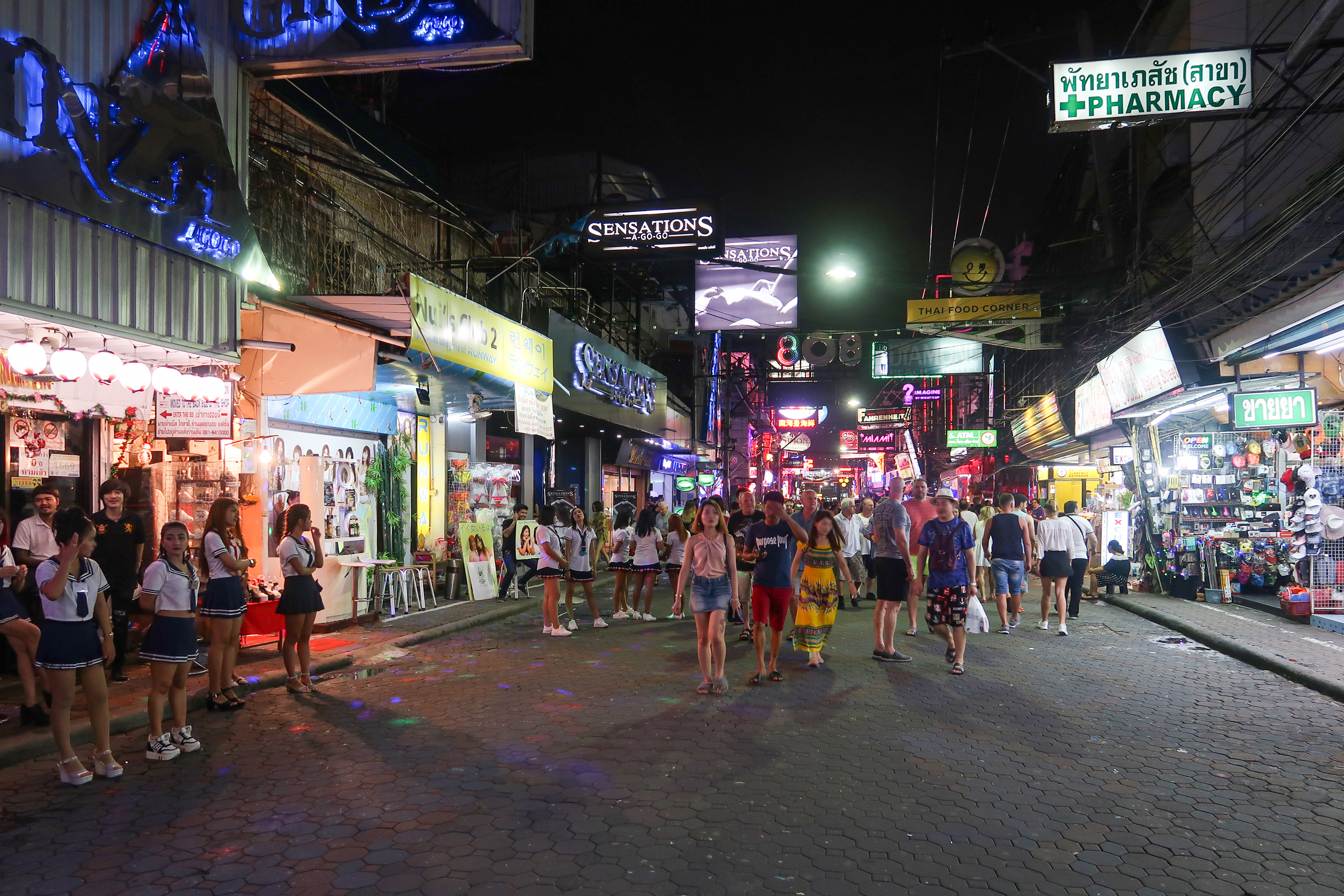
Walking Street in Pattaya in January 2018

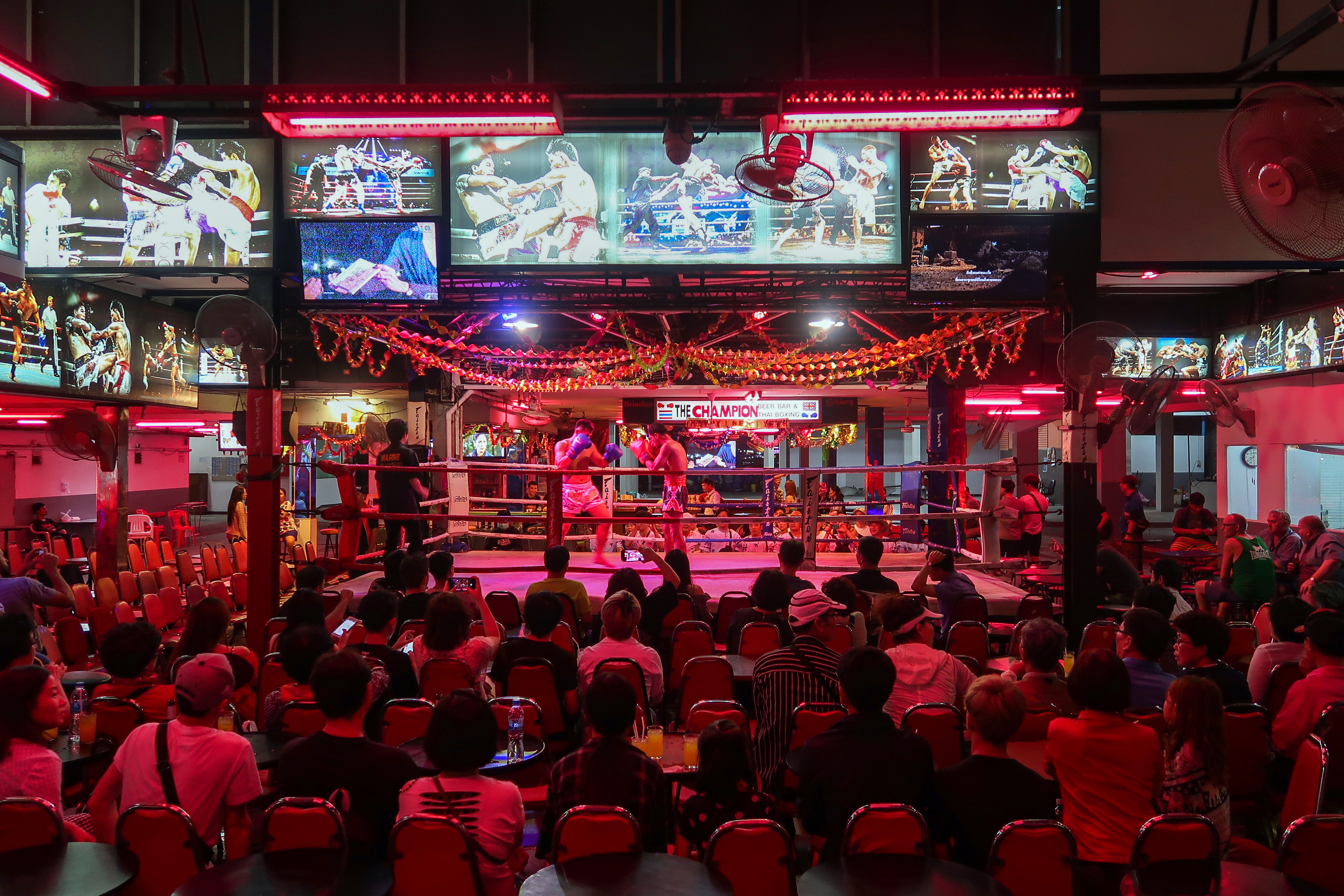
The Champion

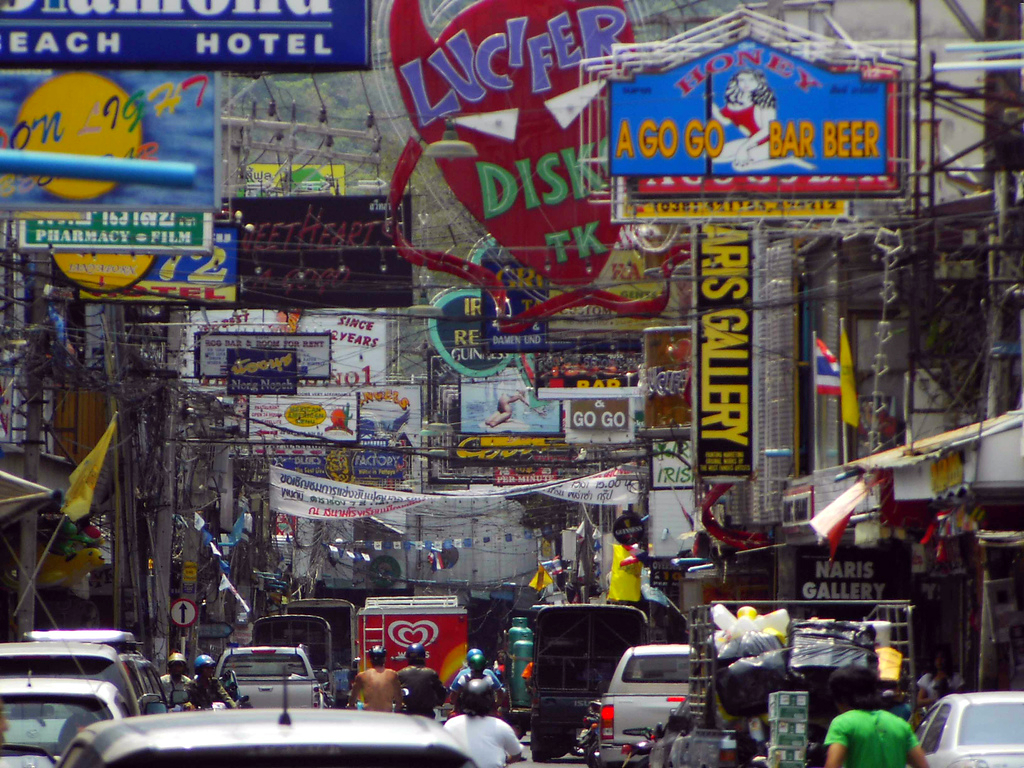
Walking Street during the day

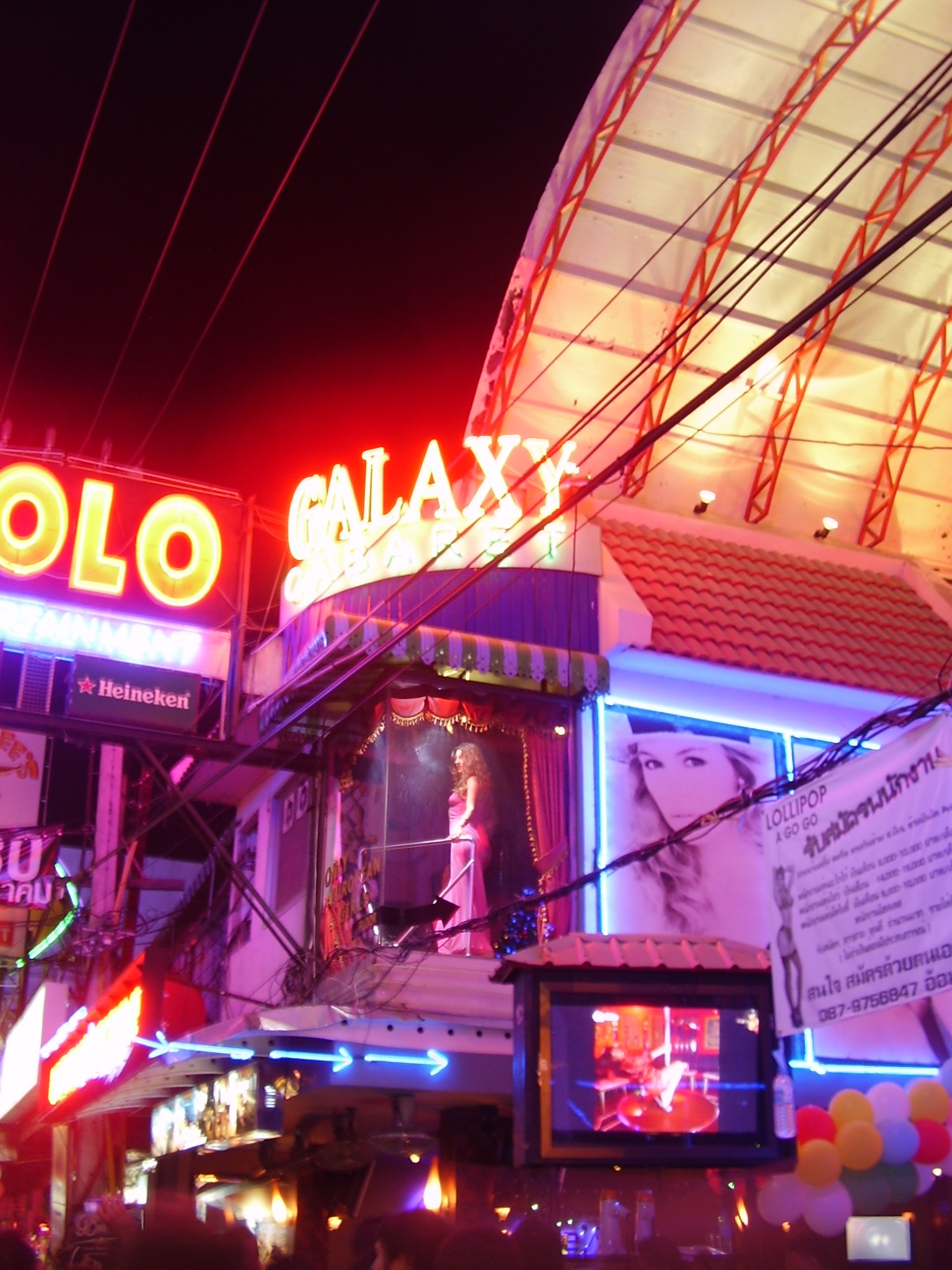
A dancer in the display window of a "Russian" go-go bar, New Year's Eve 2008
