= Sex show =

Live performance of sexual activity

A sex show is a form of live performance that features one or more performers engaging in some form of sexual activity, typically on stage, for the entertainment or sexual gratification of spectators. Performers are paid either by the spectators or by the organisers of the show. In the 21st century, interactive and live-format online sex shows have become increasingly popular, often performed by webcam models.

The range of sex shows is wide. At one end of the spectrum, they may contain little more than artistic nude dancing. At the other, they can involve the performance of explicit sexual activity for an audience. They may be private shows for a single individual or performed in front of an audience of fifty or more. In some cases there can be physical contact between members of the audience and the performer or performers.

The sexual activity can include actual or simulated autoerotic acts and/or sex acts with another performer. The performance can be in a theater style, or it can be in a peep show style. Sex shows can overlap with other sectors of the sex industry. For example, a strip club may also offer live sex performances, and a prostitute may offer to perform sex acts with another prostitute for the gratification of a patron.

== Locations ==
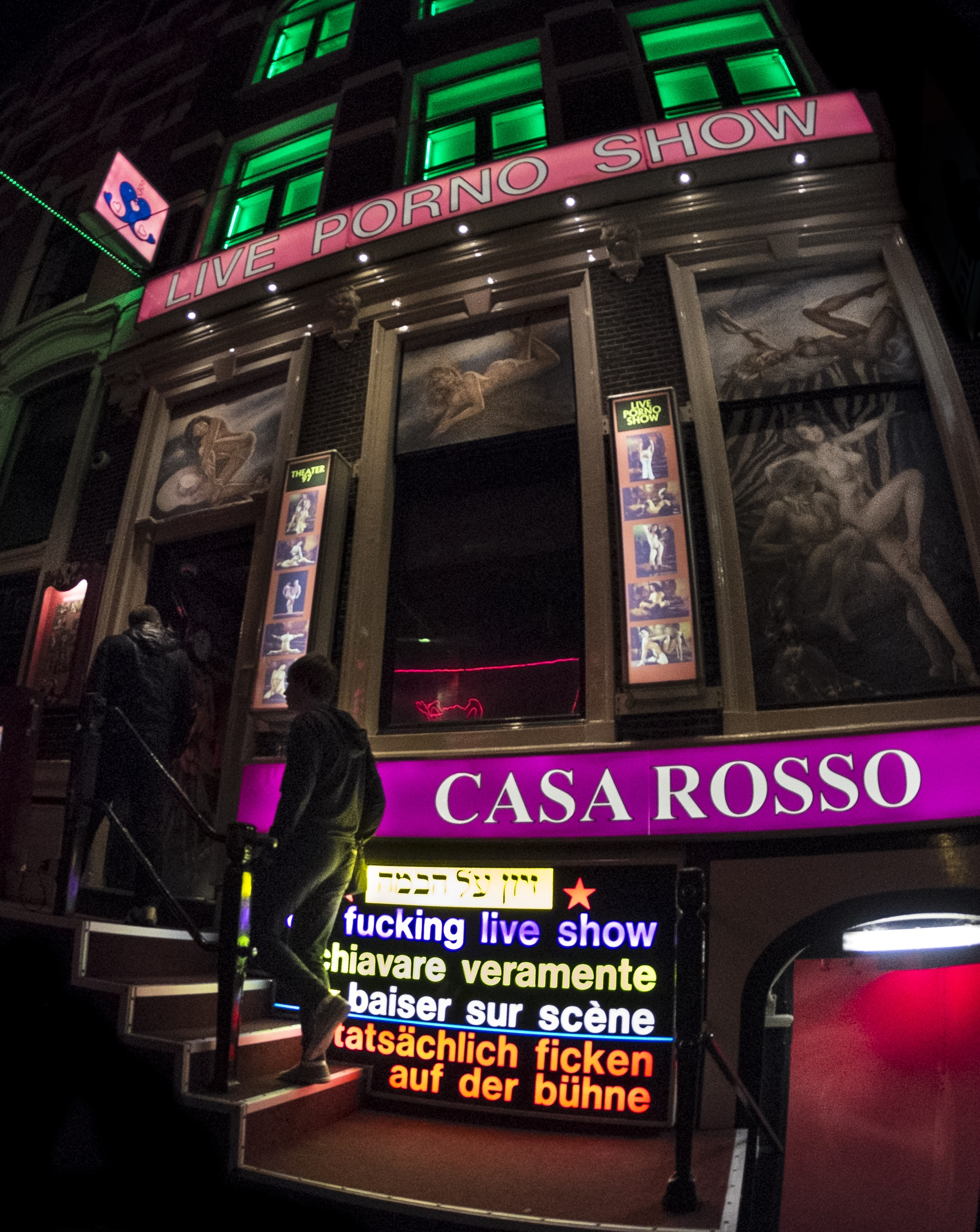
Casa Rosso Sex Show Amsterdam, September 2015

In Havana, Cuba, in the 1950s, during the second presidency of Fulgencio Batista, there were semi-legal sex shows and live pornographic theaters, such as the Shanghai Theater and the Tokyo Cabaret. The English novelist Graham Greene, writing in his autobiography Ways of Escape, described "the Shanghai Theatre where for one dollar and twenty-five cents one could see a nude cabaret of extreme obscenity with the bluest of blue films in the intervals".

The Laotian capital Vientiane was famous for sex shows at the height of American influence during the Vietnam War. Travel writer Paul Theroux described a bar in 1973 Vientiane thus: "Your eyes get accustomed to the dark and you see the waitress is naked. Without warning she jumps on the chair, pokes a cigarette into her vagina and lights it, puffing it by contracting her uterine lungs." British journalist Christopher Robbins wrote that The White Rose, a famous Vientiane bar during the war, featured floor shows in which women used their vaginas to smoke cigarettes and fling ping pong balls, a performance known as a ping pong show.

At the end of the 20th century, there was a significant increase in the number of live sex shows in downtown Melbourne and Toronto.

Around the Reeperbahn, the red-light district of Hamburg, several sex theatres (Salambo, Regina, Colibri, Safari) were once located in the Große Freiheit ("Great Freedom") street. They showed live sex acts on stage, but by 2007, the Safari was the only live sex theatre left in Germany, and that closed in 2013.

In the red light district of De Wallen in Amsterdam there are three main venues for sex shows: a hostess bar called the Bananen Bar, and the Moulin Rouge and Casa Rosso theatres, which feature on-stage sex acts and variations on the ping-pong show. Casa Rosso puts on 90-minute sex shows which are made up of nine different performances. The acts include a woman smoking a cigar using her vagina, a dominatrix who humiliates a volunteer from the audience, and a couple having sex on a rotating stage.

In Thailand, locations like Patpong in Bangkok, Walking Street, Pattaya, Bangla Road in Phuket and Ta Pae Gate in Chiang Mai have numerous venues hosting ping-pong shows. The expression "going to Bangkok" sometimes serves as a euphemism in the West for "going to a live sex show".

== Legality ==
Sex shows are subject to varying laws such as licensing requirements and locations are subject to local zoning regulations. Some jurisdictions regard a sex show as prostitution. Although it can be difficult in law to differentiate sex shows from prostitution, if a show is repeated then in some cases it can be argued that it is a form of publication, giving it a degree of legal protection under the First Amendment to the United States Constitution. Live sex shows in Europe have become rare since 2010, partly due to increased legal restrictions. In Germany, commercial live sex shows have been illegal since 2015.

The content of a sex show may also be subject to national and local obscenity and other laws. Some areas allow striptease, but no sexual activity, others may allow only simulated sexual activity or autoerotic activity, while others allow anything that is legal in recorded pornography to be performed live. Generally, as of 2010, autoerotic activity is the most common legally-available kind of live sexual activity. In some cities and countries throughout the world, live sexual activity between multiple performers is legal. Webcam performances are largely unregulated.

== See also ==
- BDSM
- Erotic dance
- Mitchell Brothers O'Farrell Theatre
- Sex club
- Stripper
