= The Maid of Orleans (poem) =

Poem by Voltaire

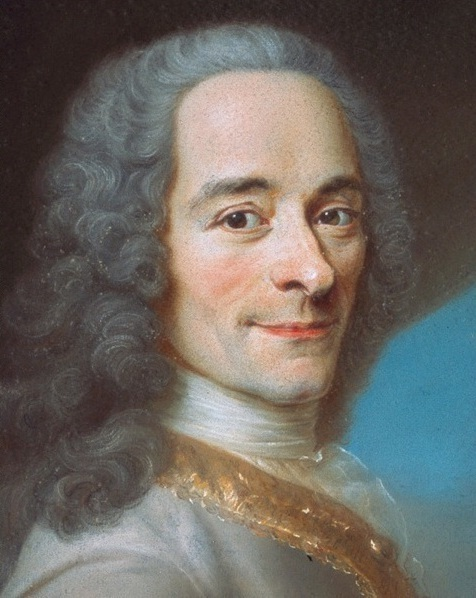
Detail from copy of Maurice Quentin de La Tour's lost portrait of Voltaire circa 1735 (Château de Ferney)

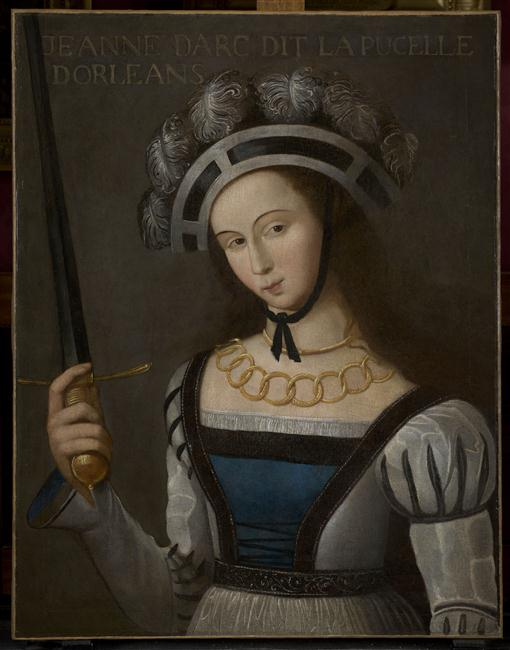
A late 17c representation of the Maid (Musée Condé )

The Maid of Orleans (French: La Pucelle d'Orléans) is a satirical poem by Voltaire about Joan of Arc, circulated in private readings and in manuscript beginning the 1730s. In response to pirated prints appearing in the 1750s, Voltaire published an authorized edition (Geneva 1762) shorn of most bawdy and anticlerical passages. One English translation is that by W. H. Ireland (1824).

== Scandal ==
Voltaire was undoubtedly one of the most controversial writers and philosophers of the Enlightenment Age, and The Maid of Orleans was also certainly one of his more contentious works. An epic and scandalous satire concerning the life of the not-yet-canonised Joan of Arc ("the Maid of Orleans"), the poem was outlawed, burned and banned throughout a great portion of Europe during the 18th and the 19th centuries. Containing mockery and satirical commentary on the life and antics of its subject, the poem itself has variously been described as "bawdy" and "licentious".

Despite the often indecent contents of the text, its notoriety and contraband status made it one of the most widely read texts concerning Joan of Arc for several centuries. Circulating throughout the banned regions by often-surreptitious means, the book was read by a large number of the populace. It was also disseminated by Voltaire himself to some of his colleagues and other members of the upper class, the circle of people and the portion of society for which the text had been specifically intended.

== Writing ==
Various sources report that Voltaire resolved to write The Maid of Orleans after a literary colleague challenged him to compose a better analysis of the Joan of Arc subject than the treatment Jean Chapelain had produced in his The Maid, or the Heroic Poem of France Delivered. Published in the mid-17th century, Chapelain's poem was a lengthy and philosophical discussion of the topic. While Chapelain's poem was much awaited by followers of his work, it was savaged by critics, and Voltaire made sure to include his own lampoon of Chapelain's work in his own take on Joan of Arc:

O Chapelain! O thou whose violin
Produced of old so harsh and vile a din;
Whose bow Apollo's malediction had,
Which scraped his history in notes so sad;
Old Chapelain! if honouring thy art
Though wouldst to me thy genius even impart,
I'll none of it...

— Voltaire, in From The Maid of Orleans, Voltaire.

After the degree of criticism that the poem received for its sexual undertones and supposedly perverted nature, Voltaire publicly became ashamed of his work and even asserted that the transcript had been somehow corrupted and tainted and so was inauthentic. He published an edited edition of the text over thirty years later, in 1762. The later variant omitted many of the themes and textual content for which the original had been so scorned.

== Allusions ==
- Alexander Pushkin patterned his Ruslan and Ludmila (1820) after "The Maid of Orleans", one of his favorite books. His last article, "The Last Relative of Jeanne d'Arc" (1837), also concerns Voltaire's poem.
- The poem is referenced repeatedly in Anatole France's 1912 novel The Gods Are Athirst as a favourite work, parts of which can be recited from memory by ordinary French citizens in the 1790s.
- In Gregory Benford's Foundation's Fear (official continuation of Isaac Asimov's Foundation series) appear sims (self-aware simulations) of Voltaire and Joan of Arc. The poem is also mentioned.

== Sources ==
- Espinasse, Francis (2004). Life of Voltaire. Kessinger Publishing. ISBN 1-4179-2151-X.
- Heimann, Nora M. (2005). Joan of Arc in French Art and Culture (1700-1855). Ashgate Publishing, Ltd. ISBN 0-7546-5085-5.
- Schlosser, Friedrich Christoph (1843). History of the Eighteenth Century and of the Nineteenth Till the Overthrow of the French Empire With Particular Reference to Mental Cultivation and Progress. Chapman and Hall.
- Standish, Frank Hall (1821). The Life of Voltaire. J. Andrews.
- Voltaire (1843). A Philosophical Dictionary. W. Dugdale.
