= Ask a Mexican =

Satirical newspaper column

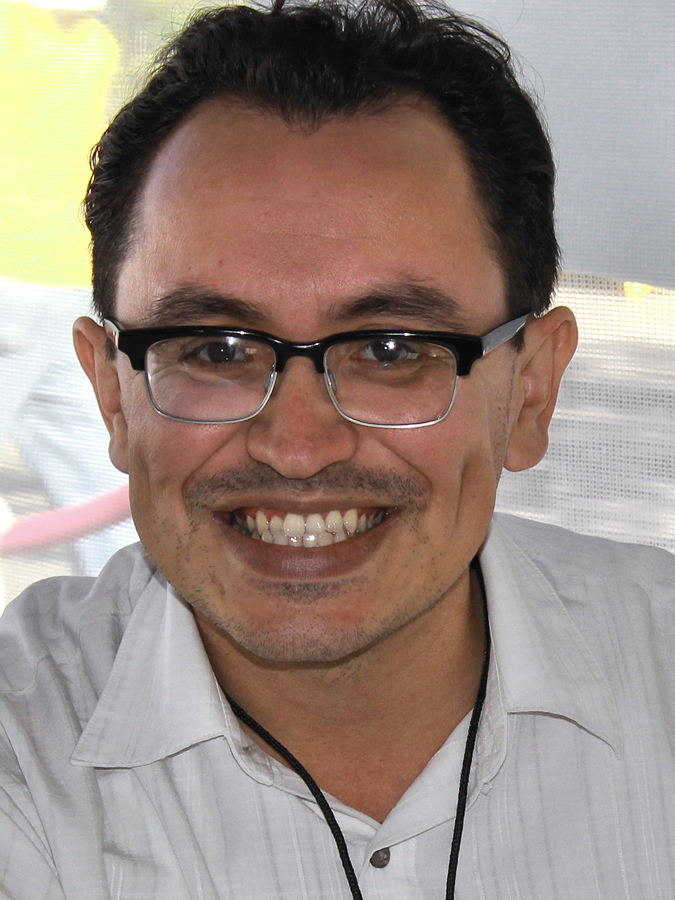
Gustavo Arellano at the 2012 Texas Book Festival.

¡Ask a Mexican! was a syndicated satirical weekly newspaper column written by Gustavo Arellano in the Orange County, California alternative weekly OC Weekly. Publication of ¡Ask a Mexican! began in 2004 as a one-time spoof, but popularity has made it one of the weekly's most popular columns.

== History ==
Every week, readers submit their questions about Mexican-American people and culture, including their customs, labor issues, and illegal immigration. Arellano usually responds to two queries a week in a politically incorrect manner often starting with the words "Dear Gabacho." The column appears in about a dozen newspapers across the country. Arellano has won numerous awards for the column, including the 2006 and 2008 Best Non-Political Column in a large-circulation weekly from the Association of Alternative Newsweeklies, the 2007 Presidents Award from the Los Angeles Press Club and an Impacto Award from the National Hispanic Media Coalition, and a 2008 Latino Spirit award from the California Latino Legislative Caucus.

The columns were collected in book form in 2008 as ¡Ask a Mexican! (Scribners, ISBN 978-1416540038).

On October 13, 2017, Arellano resigned his position with OC Weekly after refusing its owner's directive to fire half his staff. He told Tom Leykis that the paper owns the "copyright" (actually trademark) on the name ¡Ask a Mexican!, but that he intended to continue writing for other venues.
