= Gustavo Arellano =

American writer (born 1979)

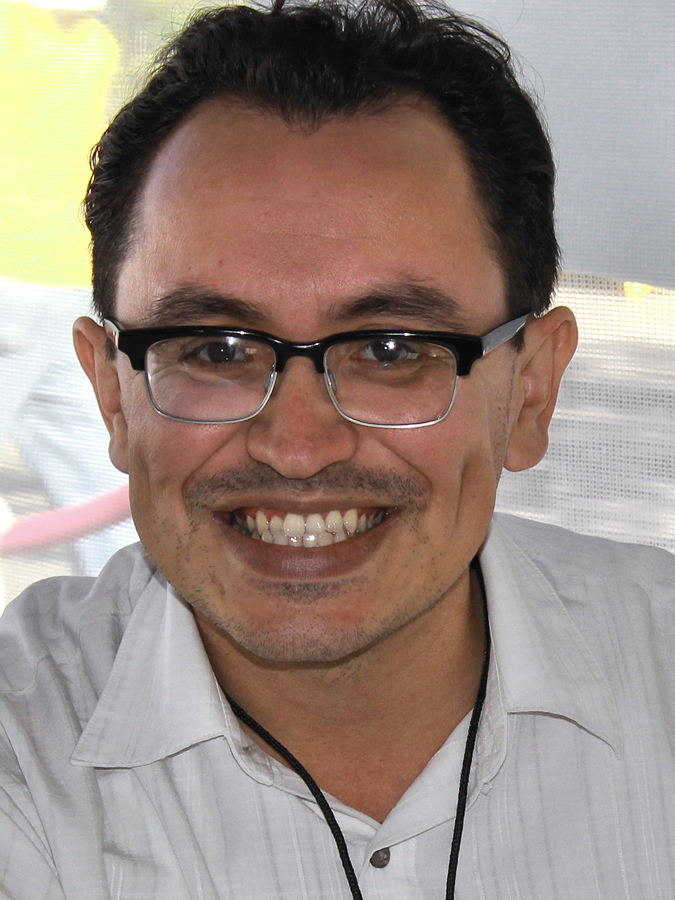
- Born: February 3, 1979 (age 47)
- Occupation: Journalist
- Relatives: Jessica Alba (cousin)
- Writing career
- Language: English
- Genres: Journalism, non-fiction, satire
- Notable work: Ask a Mexican

Gustavo Arellano (born February 3, 1979) is a Mexican American writer and journalist. He is a columnist for the Los Angeles Times and the former editor of Orange County's alternative weekly OC Weekly.

== Career ==
He is most notable as the author of the satirical column Ask a Mexican, which is syndicated nationally and has been collected into book form as ¡Ask a Mexican! (Scribner, 2008). Arellano has won numerous awards for the column, including the 2006 and 2008 Best Non-Political Column in a large-circulation weekly from the Association of Alternative Newsweeklies, the 2007 Presidents Award from the Los Angeles Press Club and an Impacto Award from the National Hispanic Media Coalition, a 2008 Latino Spirit award from the California Latino Legislative Caucus, and was part of the Los Angeles Times' Pulitzer Prize-winning team that covered the L.A. City Hall tape leak scandal.

Gustavo Arellano has contributed commentary for the weekly "Orange County Line" on KCRW, and appeared on "Good Food with Evan Kleiman". Gustavo Arellano is a journalism professor at Orange Coast College.

In 2018, Arellano was featured in the "Tacos" episode of the hit Netflix show Ugly Delicious. He has also written an episode of the American cartoon Bordertown.

== Personal life ==
He is a third cousin once removed of actress Jessica Alba. His wife owns and operates a restaurant in Santa Ana. Arellano was at the OC Weekly for 15 years before resigning in 2017. In January 2019, Arellano officially became a features writer for the Los Angeles Times, covering mostly Southern California.

== Bibliography ==
- Ask a Mexican (Scribner 2007), ISBN 978-1416540038
- Orange County: A Personal History (Scribner, 2008), ISBN 978-1416540052
- Taco USA: How Mexican Food Conquered America (Scribner, 2012), ISBN 978-1439148624
