= List of people with ovarian cancer =

This is a list of notable people who have or had ovarian cancer, whose illness attracted publicity.

Ovarian cancer is a cancer that forms in or on an ovary. It results in abnormal cells that have the ability to invade or spread to other parts of the body. When this process begins, there may be no or only vague symptoms. Symptoms become more noticeable as the cancer progresses. These symptoms may include bloating, pelvic pain, abdominal swelling, and loss of appetite, among others. Common areas to which the cancer may spread include the lining of the abdomen, lymph nodes, lungs, and liver.

== Acting ==
Name	Lifetime	Comments	Reference
Evelyn Ankers	1918 – 1985	American film actress	
Kathy Bates	1948 –	Oscar-winning American actress (later treated for breast cancer and lymphedema), surviving	
Laurie Beechman	1953 – 1998	American actress/singer	
Marcheline Bertrand	1950 – 2007	American film actress; mother of Angelina Jolie and James Haven	
Diem Brown	1980 – 2014	American reality TV star (The Real World and Road Rules; died at age 34, nine years after diagnosis)	
Márcia Cabrita	1964 – 2017	Brazilian actress	
Ann Carter	1936 – 2014	American child actress (The Curse of the Cat People)	
Veronica Castang	1938—1988	British film, stage and television actress	
Carol Channing	1921 – 2019	American stage and musical comedy actress	
Cayle Chernin	1947 – 2011	Canadian actress, writer, and producer	
Caitlin Clarke	1952 – 2004	American actress	
Sandy Dennis	1937 – 1992	Tony Award and Oscar-winning American theater and film actress	
Diana Dors	1931 – 1984	British actress, also known as Diana d'Ors	
Susan Fleetwood	1944 – 1995	British film actress	
Lovette George	1961 – 2006	American actress and singer	
Lynda Gibson	1956 – 2004	Australian comedian and actress	
Marjorie Gross	1956 – 1996	Canadian comedian and television writer/producer (Seinfeld)	
Dolly Haas	1910 – 1994	German-American actress and singer	
Joan Hackett	1934 – 1983	American actress	
Cassandra Harris	1948 – 1991	Australian actress; first wife of Pierce Brosnan (died at age 43; Cassandra Harris's mother, Mrs. Roma Waites, and Harris' daughter, Charlotte Brosnan (aged 41), also both died of the disease)	
Cecilia Hart	1948 – 2016	American television and stage actress	
Dianne Heatherington	1948 – 1966	Canadian film and television actress	
Madeline Kahn	1942 – 1999	American actress, singer and comedian	
Tomoko Kawakami	1970 – 2011	Japanese voice actress	
Grace Keagy	1921 – 2009	American musical theatre, soap opera and television actress	
Manisha Koirala	1970 –	Bollywood actress and political activist, surviving	
Joyce Kulhawik	1952 –	American film critic and Boston television personality; former TV co-host of movie critic Leonard Maltin; surviving	
Marjie Lawrence	1932 – 2010	British actress	
Sinnamon Love	1973 –	African American former pornographic film actress and director, surviving	
Janet Margolin	1943 – 1993	American film, stage, and television actress	
Mariann Mayberry	1965 – 2017	American actress	
Marin Mazzie	1960 – 2018	American actress and singer	
Heather Menzies	1949 – 2017	Canadian-American actress and model; widow of actor Robert Urich. Menzies-Urich died on December 24, 2017, aged 68, from brain cancer	
Mary Millar	1936 – 1998	British actress, most famous as "Rose" from Keeping Up Appearances	
Helen Simpson Morosini	1933 – 2005	mother of the late American singer/actress/activist Dana Reeve	
Anita Morris	1943 – 1994	American actress, singer and dancer	
Akemi Negishi	1934 – 2008	Japanese film actress	
Kate O'Mara	1939 – 2014	English actress	
Beverley Owen	1937 – 2019	American actress	
Julie Parrish	1940 – 2003	American film, stage and television actress	
Alice Pearce	1917 – 1966	American comedic stage, film and television actress	
Gilda Radner	1946 – 1989	American actress/comedian (Saturday Night Live)	
Rachel Rockwell	1969 – 2018	American actress, theater director and choreographer	
Candida Royalle	1950 – 2015	American pornographic actress, producer and director	
Janet Seidel	1955 – 2017	Australian cabaret singer, jazz vocalist, pianist and music teacher; Bell Awards (2006) winner	
Linda Smith	1958 – 2006	British actress/comedian; head of the British Humanists' Association	
Cobie Smulders	1982 –	Canadian actress and model; surviving	
Smita Talwalkar	1954 – 2014	Indian Bollywood actress, director and producer	
Jessica Tandy	1909 – 1994	Oscar-winning (Driving Miss Daisy) British-born American stage, film and television actress	
Bridgette Wilson	1973 –	American retired actress, surviving	
Tera Wray	1982 – 2016	American pornographic actress, died of an apparent suicide	
Celeste Yarnall	1944 – 2018	American actress	
Loretta Young	1913 – 2000	Oscar-winning (The Farmer's Daughter, 1947), American film and television actress	

== Arts ==
Name	Lifetime	Comments	Reference
Rita Angus	1908 – 1970	New Zealand artist and painter	
Nancy Graves	1939 – 1995	American sculptor, painter, printmaker, and filmmaker	
Sally Gross	1933 – 2015	American dancer, choreographer and teacher of dance	
Barbara Hammer	1939 – 2019	American filmmaker	
Denise Jefferson	1944 – 2010	American dancer/director of the Ailey School	
Tamara Natalie Madden	1975 – 2017	Jamaican artist	
Stephenie McMillan	1942 – 2013	British set decorator	
Suzanne Mizzi	1967 – 2011	British-Maltese glamour model, singer, interior designer and abstract artist	
Miriam Mone	1965 – 2007	County Armagh-born Irish fashion designer	
Meryl O'Loughlin	1933 – 2007	American casting director and talent executive	
Mary Oppen	1908 – 1990	American activist, artist, photographer, poet and writer	
Melinda Camber Porter	1953 – 2008	British artist, author, poet, journalist and filmmaker	
Beau St. Clair	c. 1952 – 2016	American film producer	
Margi Scharff	1955 – 2007	American artist	

== Business ==
Name	Lifetime	Comments	Reference
Dorothy Brunson	1939 – 2011	American businesswoman; first African American woman to own radio and television stations	
Patricia C. Dunn	1953 – 2011	American businesswoman and former Hewlett-Packard executive	
Evelyn Lauder	1936 – 2011	Vienna-born New York businesswoman, breast cancer awareness activist, and philanthropist	

== Music ==
Name	Lifetime	Comments	Reference
Marcia Barrett	1948 –	Jamaican-born British singer, surviving	
Eileen Barton	1924 – 2006	American singer	
Alma Cogan	1932 – 1966	English singer/entertainer	
Kartina Dahari	1941 – 2014	Malaysian singer	
Holly Dunn	1957 – 2016	American country music performer	
Lorraine Ellison	1931 – 1983	American soul singer	
Susan Fernandez (aka Susan Fernandez Magno)	1956 – 2009	Filipino singer, activist and academic	
Frances Ginsberg	1955 – 2010	American operatic soprano (died at age 55 from ovarian cancer; had previously been treated for breast cancer)	
Joyce Hatto	1928 – 2006	British pianist	
Olga Jackowska	1951 – 2018	Polish rock singer	
Shizuko Kasagi	1914 –1985	Japanese jazz singer and actress	
Dixie Lee	1911 – 1952	American singer; first wife of Bing Crosby (died three days before her 41st birthday)	
Valisia LeKae	1979 –	American singer and musical theatre actress, surviving	
Vange Leonel	1963 – 2014	Brazilian singer-songwriter, guitarist, journalist, blogger, novelist, playwright, feminist/LGBT activist	
Connie Needham	1959 –	American dancer and former actress, surviving	
Laura Nyro	1947 – 1997	American singer-songwriter (died at age 49; her mother, Gilda Nigro, also died of ovarian cancer at age 49)	
Mimi Parker	1967 - 2022	American drummer and vocalist in the band Low	
Dinah Shore	1916 – 1994	American singer and actress	
Hikaru Utada	1983 –	Japanese-American singer-songwriter, surviving	
Angela Winbush	1955 –	American rhythm and blues vocalist; surviving	

== Politics ==
Name	Lifetime	Comments	Reference
Professor Dora Nkem Akunyili	1954 – 2014	Nigerian politician and academic	
Maryam Babangida	1948 – 2009	Nigerian first lady	
Pam Brown	1952 – 2011	American politician (died at age 58)	
Tina Brozman	1952 – 2007	American lawyer and judge	
Anita Connick	1967–	American lawyer, judge and Louisiana Supreme Court justice	
Rosa DeLauro	1943 –	US congresswoman (D-CT), surviving	
Jeannie Ferris	1941 – 2007	Australian politician	
Ella Grasso	1919 – 1981	American politician; first woman ever to be elected a state governor in the United States in her own right	
Judy Kennedy	1944 – 2018	American politician, Mayor of Newburgh, New York from 2012 to 2018	
Laura Knaperek	1955 – 2016	American politician, public official, and member of the Arizona House of Representatives	
Lim Bee Kau		Malaysian politician, MP for Padang Serai from 1999 to 2009	
Mary I of England, née Mary Tudor	1516 – 1558	(died from either uterine cancer or ovarian cancer, aged 42)	
Nancy McDonald	1934 – 2007	American politician	
Helen W. Milliken	1922 – 2012	wife of former Michigan governor William Milliken and one-time Michigan First Lady	
Natalie "Nan" Cornell Rehnquist	1924 – 2005	wife of US Supreme Court Chief Justice William Rehnquist	
Ruth Samuelson	1959 – 2017	American politician, member (2007–15) of the North Carolina General Assembly	
Linda Scheid	1942 – 2011	American activist, lawyer and politician (died at age 68, the day before what would have been her 69th birthday)	
Joanna Strathdee	1954 – 2015	Scottish politician (died at age 60)	
Susan Tolchin	1941 – 2016	American political scientist	
Haydee Yorac	1941 — 2005	Filipino public servant, law professor and politician	

== Science and medicine ==
Name	Lifetime	Comments	Reference
Dr Barbara Mary Ansell	1923 —2001	British scientist and paediatric rheumatologist	
Dr Nadia Chaudhri	1977 – 2021	Pakistani-Canadian neuroscientist	
Vicky Clement-Jones	1948 – 1987	Hong Kong-born English physician	
Dr. Rosalind Franklin	1920 – 1958	British chemist and crystallographer, linked to discovery of the shape of the double helix of DNA	
Hasri Ainun Habibie	1937 – 2010	Indonesian physician and wife of President B. J. Habibie; served as First Lady of Indonesia from 1998 to 1999	
Gisela Mosig	1930 – 2003	German-American molecular biologist	
Janet Rowley	1925 – 2013	American cancer researcher	

== Sports ==
Name	Lifetime	Comments	Reference
Marina Baiul	1977-	mother of Ukrainian Olympic figure skater Oksana Baiul	
Raelene Boyle	1951 –	Australian athlete, surviving	
Maureen Connolly	1934 – 2011	tennis great; first woman to win four grand slam titles in one year	
Chris Evert	1954 -	American former world No. 1 tennis player. 7-time year-end world no. 1 singles player. Evert won 157 singles titles and 32 doubles titles. Stage 1c ovarian cancer; surviving	
Myra Nathalie Kraft	1934 – 1969	wife of businessman and owner of the New England Patriots football team, Robert "Bob" Kraft	
Sarabeth Kusick	1948 – 2006	wife of American baseball player Craig Kusick (died at age 56); her husband died from leukemia (aged 57), nine months following her death	
Shannon Miller	1977 –	American Olympic gold-medalist gymnast; surviving	
Roberta "Bobbi" Olson	1936 – 2001	wife of retired Hall of Fame basketball coach Lute Olson	
Bernardine Portenski	1949 – 2017	New Zealand long-distance runner	

== Writing ==
Name	Lifetime	Comments	Reference
Andrea Adams	1946 – 1995	English BBC broadcaster, journalist and anti-bullying activist	
Glenda Adams	1939 – 2007	Australian novelist and writer	
Judith Appelbaum	1939 – 2018	American editor, consultant and author	
Carol Bly	1930 – 2007	American essayist and short-story writer	
Clare Boylan	1948 – 2006	Irish writer	
Zenobia Camprubí Aymar	1887 – 1956	Spanish-born (of Catalan and Puerto Rican descent) writer, poet and translator	
Bonnie Christensen	1951 – 2015	American children's book author and illustrator	
Claudia Cohen	1950 – 2007	American socialite and journalist	
Helen Cresswell	1934 – 2005	British writer and author	
Sara Douglass	1957 – 2011	Australian fantasy writer	
Catherine Gaskin	1929 – 2009	Irish-Australian novelist	
Martha Gellhorn	1908 – 1998	American war correspondent, novelist, journalist (committed suicide, aged 89, after ovarian cancer metastasized to her liver)	
Debbie Goad	1954 – 2000	American journalist and magazine publisher	
Josephine Hart, Lady Saatchi	1942 – 2011	Irish-born British-based novelist	
Pagan Kennedy	1963 –	American author, surviving	
Francess Lantz	1952 – 2004	American librarian, novelist and writer	
Clarice Lispector	1920 – 1977	Brazilian prose writer	
Norah McClintock	1952 – 2017	Canadian author	
Ursula Nordstrom	1910 – 1988	American book editor	
Barbara Park	1947 – 2013	American author of children's books	
Doris Pilkington Garimara	1937 – 2014	Australian author	
Mary Raftery	1957 – 2012	Irish investigative journalist, filmmaker and writer	
Amy Krouse Rosenthal	1965 – 2017	American author, filmmaker, and radio show host	
Liz Tilberis	1947 – 1999	British-born American-based fashionista; editor-in-chief of Harper's Bazaar	
Joyce Wadler	1948 –	New York journalist and New York Times columnist; surviving	
Mari Yonehara	1950 – 2006	Japanese translator, essayist, non-fiction writer and novelist	
Yvonne Zanos	1950–2010	American television journalist (at KDKA-TV)	

== Miscellaneous ==
Name	Lifetime	Comments	Reference
Christiane Amanpour	1958 -	Journalist	
Maria del Carmen Bousada de Lara	1940 – 2009	World's oldest mother	
Jill Chaifetz	1964 – 2006	American lawyer and children's right advocate	
Doris Dungey	1961 – 2008	American blogger and analyst on economic and finance issues	
Ann Dunham	Uterine Cancer 1942 – 1995	American anthropologist; mother of U.S. President Barack Obama	
Robert Eads	1945 – 1999	American female to male transsexual who was denied medical treatment for the cancer in the US state of Georgia	
Johanna Silver Gordon	1942 – 2000	American schoolteacher (died at age 58 in 2000), for whom "Johanna's Law" was named	
Linda Grover	1934 – 2010	American peace activist, founder of Global Family Day	
Sharon Tyler Herbst	1942 – 2007	American chef and cookbook author	
Margaret Juntwait	1957 – 2015	American radio host, host of Metropolitan Opera radio broadcasts from 2004 to 2014	
Amy Kass	1940 – 2015	American academic and educator at the University of Chicago	
Coretta Scott King	1927 – 2006	American civil rights activist; widow of Martin Luther King Jr.	
Fay Honey Knopp	1918 – 1995	Quaker minister, peace and civil rights advocate, and prison abolitionist.	
Wangari Muta Maathai	1940 – 2011	Kenyan environmental and political activist	
Captain Rosemary Bryant Mariner	1953 – 2019	American military aviator; one of the first six women to earn their wings as a United States Naval Aviator in 1974	
Monique Leroy Martinot	d. 1984	French cause célèbre for cryostasis	
Elly Mayday	1988 – 2019	Canadian model, advocate, and writer	
Bess Myerson	1924 – 2014	American model (crowned Miss American 1945), television personality and political appointee; survived → died of natural causes at age 90 in 2014	
Dawn O'Donnell	1927/1928 – 2007	Australian LGBT rights activist, campaigner, and entrepreneur	
Patsy Ramsey	1956 – 2006	Garnered notoriety (with her husband) following the 1996 murder of their daughter, JonBenét	
Susan, Lady Renouf	1942 – 2016	Australian socialite	
Jolie Christine Rickman	1970 – 2005	American feminist, social activist and musician	
Judith Merkle Riley	1942 – 2010	American academic, educator and novelist	
Lou Halsell Rodenberger	1926 – 2009	American educator, professor, and journalist	
Jemera Rone	1944 – 2015	American human rights activist, who served as Human Rights Watch of East Africa Coordinator	
Gillian Rose	1947 – 1995	British academic	
Urairat Soimee	1968, 1970, or 1971 – 2006	Thai human trafficking victim who sued her traffickers and sought justice for victims	
Sheila Varian	1937 – 2016	American horse breeder	
Margaret Mary Vojtko	1930 – 2013	American academic and educator (died of a heart attack; had been receiving treatment for ovarian cancer)	
Nina Wang	1936 – 2007	Chair of Chinachem Group, Asia's richest woman at the time of her death	
