= Jolis =

Jolis is a surname. Notable people with the surname include:

- Albert Jolis (1912–2000), American anti-communist
- Chantal Jolis (1947–2012), Canadian radio and television host
- Isabel Jolís Oliver (1682–1770), Spanish printer and engraver

== See also ==
- Joli
