= Jolie (name) =

Jolie (/ʒoʊˈliː/ zhoh-LEE or /dʒoʊˈliː/ joh-LEE) is a female given name of French origin, and its meaning is 'pretty'. The name derives from the French word joli, from Old French jolif, which in turn derives from the Latin gaudēre meaning 'to enjoy'. It is occasionally spelled as Jolee or Joli. It is also a matronymic surname.

Notable people with the name include:

== Surname ==
- Angelina Jolie (born Angelina Jolie Voight in 1975), American actress
- Jade Jolie, American drag queen
- Ruud Jolie, the main guitarist of the Dutch symphonic metal band Within Temptation

== Given name ==
- Jolie, a nickname of entertainer Al Jolson
- Jolie Christine Rickman, a feminist and social activist
- Jolie Gabor, known as "Mama Jolie", the mother of sisters Zsa Zsa, Eva and Magda Gabor
- Jolie Hodson, New Zealand businesswoman

== See also ==
- SS Jolee, a Design 1022 cargo ship in service 1917–1944
