= Jolie (disambiguation) =

Angelina Jolie (born 1975) is an American actress.

Jolie may also refer to:

- Jolie (name), a given name and surname (and list of people with the name)
- Jolie (magazine), a Lahori fashion magazine
- Jolie (programming language), a programming language for microservices
- Jolie & the Wanted, an African country music band
- Al Jolson or Jolie, entertainer
- Angelina Pivarnick or Jolie, cast member of Jersey Shore
- Lil Jolie (born 2000), Italian singer-songwriter
- Jolie, a character in Incarnations of Immortality
- Aptostichus angelinajolieae, the Angelina Jolie trapdoor spider

== See also ==
- Joli (disambiguation)
- Jolie Brise, a sailboat
