= EMPOWER =

Thai non-governmental organization

- Formation: 1984
- Type: NGO
- Purpose: Support of sex workers
- Region served: Thailand
- Founder and Director: Chantawipa Apisuk
- Website: https://www.empowerlibrary.online/

EMPOWER ("Education Means Protection Of Women Engaged in Recreation"), also known as Centre for Sex Workers' Protection or Moolniti Songserm Okard Pooying (Thai: มูลนิธิส่งเสริมโอกาสผู้หญิง), is a non-profit organization in Thailand that supports sex workers by offering free classes in language, health, law and pre-college education, as well as individual counselling. The organization also lobbies the government to extend regular labor protections to sex workers and to decriminalize sex work. The organization maintains centres in Patpong (Bangkok), Chiang Mai, Mae Sai and Patong, Phuket.

== Philosophy ==
EMPOWER is an organization that represents and provides services exclusively to sex workers. Unlike some Thai organizations operating in this field, EMPOWER's guiding principles include a non-judgmental stance on sex work and the belief that sex workers should not be pressured to leave the trade. Partly because of this, EMPOWER receives minimal financial support from the Thai government; the bulk of donations come from abroad.

== History ==
After graduating from the Faculty of Sociology and Anthropology at Thammasat University, Chantawipa Apisuk commenced work at the Southeast Asia Resource Center in New York to further her studies and work on human rights issues. Following her return to Thailand in 1984, Apisuk and a group of sex workers in Patpong, Bangkok, Thailand founded EMPOWER that same year. Apisuk continues to serve as the organization's director and manages the head office in Nonthaburi Province.

As of 2012, the organization operated centers in eleven provinces and reached over 20,000 sex workers on a regular basis. Over the 27 years that EMPOWER has existed, over 50,000 sex workers have been involved with the organization.

At the 2004 International AIDS Conference in Bangkok, EMPOWER set up a mock go-go bar complete with a dancer to highlight efforts to increase condom use among sex workers. This was criticized by then Health Minister Sudarat Keyuraphan.

Shortly after the tsunami of December 2004, EMPOWER opened an office in Patong, Phuket. The organization published a report that estimated a death toll of over 2,000 sex workers and lamented the lack of support for migrant sex workers affected by the flood.

In September 2005, EMPOWER broadcast a radio program for sex workers in Phuket, Chiang Mai, and Mae Sai to educate sex workers on their rights.

In 2024, while a draft bill to legalize prostitution had been under consideration in parliament for five years, EMPOWER wrote a letter to various Thai political parties, demanding that sex workers be treated equally to other workers.

== "Can Do" bar ==
In 2006 EMPOWER opened a worker-owned bar in Chiang Mai named "Can Do". It was designed to be a model of exemplary working conditions in the industry, which include giving workers a day off per week and providing social security benefits. Lek, part-owner of the bar and a Thai sex worker of six years at the time, stated in 2011: "I am very happy here. I practice my profession in a safe and protective environment". In 2009 the Director of Empower Bangkok at the time, Noi Apisuk, explained:

We created the Can Do bar as a model for business – an "experitainment": an experiment in entertainment. We are providing a safe and inspiring workplace environment for our workers. We want to demonstrate that even—or especially—in sex work, occupational and safety issues exist and there should be compliance with Thai labour laws. And if so, the employees and the management benefit.

== "This is Us" museum ==
Chantawipa opened "This Is Us", an appointment-only museum that celebrates Thailand's centuries-old tradition of prostitution. Housed in an anonymous building on the outskirts of Bangkok, it attempts to show a different perspective on sex work. Placards dotted around the museum claim that sex work has played an integral role in Thailand's economy since an elite brothel was first opened and placed under royal control in 1680. The fee for services then started at 50 satang, a single coin that would be worth US$28 today. Chantawipa notes that, "it costs about the same" now.

Of interest are the papier-mâché dolls named "kumjing". Each doll was crafted by a real woman who is working in Thailand's sex industry. Each doll symbolized the aspirations of a migrant with dreams of sex work leading to a better future.

The museum was opened to the public in 2016.

== Publications ==
Publications in Thai and English are available at https://www.empowerlibrary.online/.

In 2003 the organization published a report that stated that many anti-trafficking organizations failed to recognize the important difference between migrant sex workers and women forced to undertake sex work against their will. The report documented a "raid and rescue" operation on a Chiang Mai brothel in May 2003 that was carried out by TRAFCORD, with support from the International Justice Mission (IJM). The operation was completed without the consent of the sex workers in question and, according to EMPOWER, resulted in numerous human rights violations. IJM subsequently ended its counter-trafficking work in Thailand. Apisuk has said that these raids and subsequent arrests only worsen the situation of most prostitutes.

In 2012 EMPOWER published a report, Hit and Run: The impact of anti-trafficking policy and practice on Sex Workers' Human Rights in Thailand, in which regional sex workers were surveyed over the course of one year to assess the state of the profession. The report prompted Apisuk to state: "We have now reached a point in history where there are more women in the Thai sex industry being abused by anti-trafficking practices than there are women exploited by traffickers."

EMPOWER published 26 issues of a Thai-language newsletter called Bad Girls, in which sex workers could express themselves. The final edition was published in 1991.

== Awards ==
UNAIDS and UNDP announced at the XVII International AIDS Conference, 2008 in Mexico City, Mexico, that EMPOWER was the recipient of one of 25 Red Ribbon Awards. This award, designed to celebrate community leadership and action on AIDS, included a US$5,000 stipend that allowed EMPOWER to participate in the conference.

== See also ==
- Prostitution in Thailand
