= Rickman =

Rickman is both a surname and a given name. As a surname, one origin is as the English version of the German surname Ryckman.

Notable people with the name include:

People with the surname Rickman:

- Alan Rickman (1946–2016), English film, television and stage actor
- John Rickman (parliamentary official) (1771–1840), English statistician and government official
- John Rickman (psychoanalyst) (1891–1951), English psychoanalyst
- Jolie Christine Rickman (1970–2005), American feminist, humanitarian, and social activist
- Phil Rickman (1950–2024), British author
- Thomas 'Clio' Rickman (1760–1834), English writer and bookseller
- Thomas Rickman (1776–1841), English architect
- Thomas Rickman (writer), American screenwriter (also goes as Tom Rickman)
- William Rickman (1731–1783), political leader of the American Revolution

People with the given name Rickman:

- Sir Rickman Godlee, 1st Baronet (1849–1925), English surgeon

== Fictional characters ==
- Angus Rickman, fictional character in the television series Sliders
- Dennis Rickman, fictional character in the soap opera EastEnders
- Sharon Watts, fictional character in the soap opera EastEnders

== See also ==
- 3692 Rickman, main-belt asteroid
- Rickman Motorcycles, defunct motor vehicle manufacturer of the United Kingdom
- Richman
