= Prostitution in Thailand =

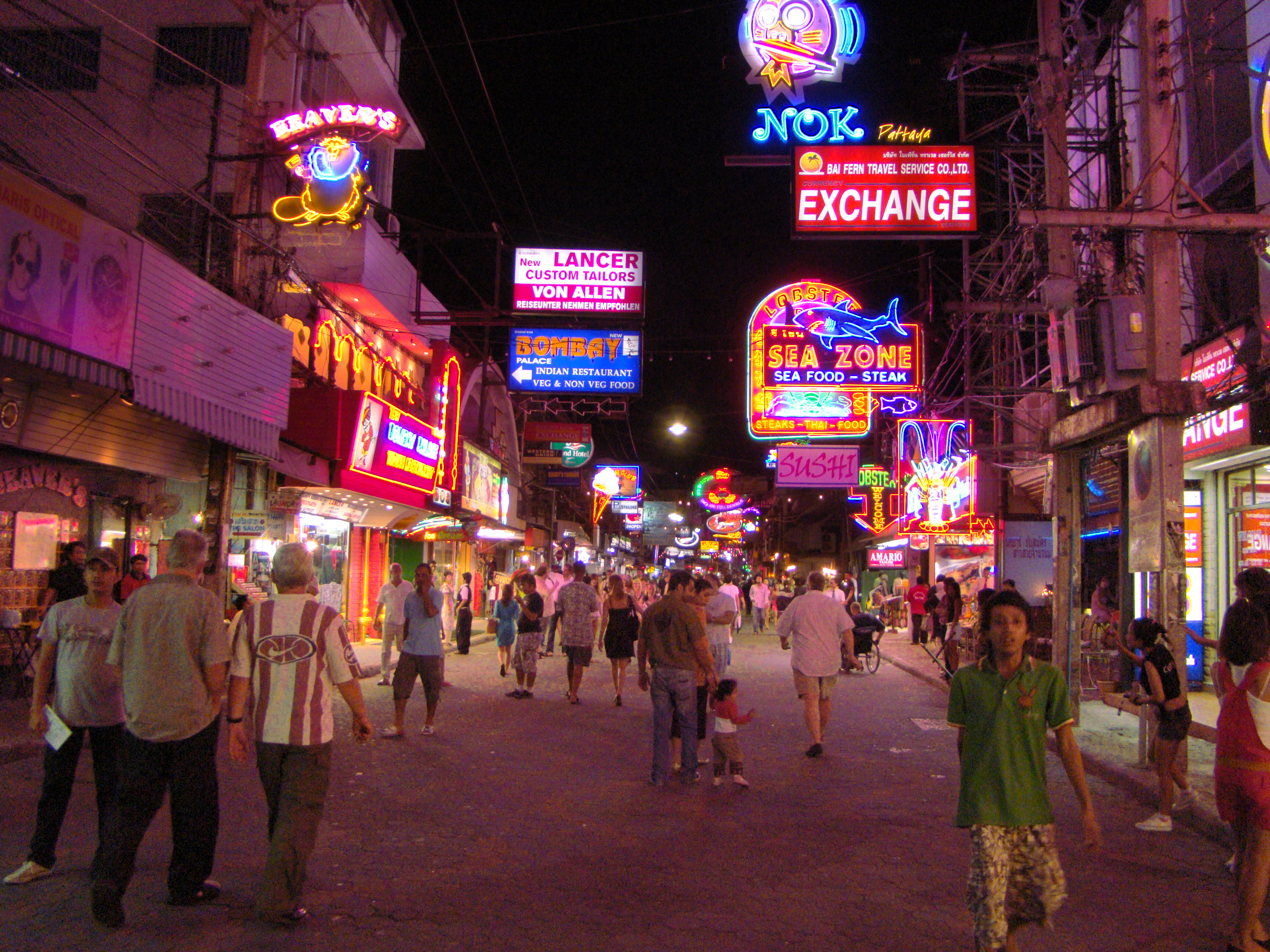
Walking Street, a red-light district in Pattaya.

Prostitution by legal status in Asia Legalization – legal and regulated Abolitionism – legal and not regulated; organized activities such as brothels and pimping illegal Neo-abolitionism illegal to buy sex and for 3rd party involvement, legal to sell sex Prohibitionism – illegal Varies with local laws

Prostitution in Thailand is not itself illegal, but public solicitation for prostitution is prohibited if it is carried out "openly and shamelessly" or "causes nuisance to the public". Due to police corruption and an economic reliance on prostitution dating back to the Vietnam War, it remains a significant presence in the country. It results from poverty, low levels of education and a lack of employment in rural areas. Prostitutes mostly come from the northeastern (Isan) region of Thailand, from ethnic minorities or from neighbouring countries, especially Cambodia, Myanmar, and Laos. In 2019, the Joint United Nations Programme on HIV/AIDS (UNAIDS) estimated the total population of sex workers in Thailand to be 43,000.

== Legal underpinnings ==
The legal framework governing prostitution in Thailand is based upon three acts:

=== Prevention and Suppression of Prostitution Act ===
The Prevention and Suppression of Prostitution Act, B.E. 2539 (1996) is the statute most directly dealing with prostitution. Under the act, the definition of "prostitution" is "Sexual intercourse, or any other act, or the commission of any other act in order to gratify the sexual desire of another person in a promiscuous manner in return for money or any other benefit, irrespective of whether the person who accepts the act and the person who commits the act are of the same sex or not." A clear definition of the phrase "in a promiscuous manner" is not provided.

Under the act, persons who solicit sex "... in an open and shameless manner..." (a phrase that is not clearly defined), or who are "... causing nuisance to the public..." are subject to a fine. Persons associating in a "prostitution establishment" with another person for the purpose of prostitution faces a jail term or a fine or both. The term "prostitution establishment" is clearly defined in Section 4 of the relevant Act, and it may be broadly interpreted to include any place where prostitution takes place, especially in regard to cases involving sexual abuse of children that carry heavier penalties (up to six years if the child is younger than 15 years of age)—otherwise, the law is not usually enforced against prostitution in private places. The act also imposes heavier penalties against owners of prostitution businesses and establishments. The criminal code also stipulates penalties for procuring or using money earned from prostitution.

The Prevention and Suppression of Prostitution Act was written with a particular focus upon sexual abuse and trafficking of children. Section 8 penalizes those who sexually abuse children under the age of 15 years with a prison term of two to six years and a fine of up to 120,000 baht. For child victims between the ages of 15 and 18 years, the prison term is one to three years, and the fine is up to 60,000 baht.

In regard to trafficking, Section 9 of the act states that, "Any person who procures, seduces or takes away any person for the prostitution of such person, even with her or his consent and irrespective of whether the various acts which constitute an offence are committed within or outside the Kingdom, shall be liable to imprisonment for a term of one to ten years and to a fine of twenty thousand to two hundred thousand Baht."

Additionally, any offense under Section 9 that is committed "by means of fraud, deceit, threat, violence, [or] the exercise of undue influence or coercion," results in a penalty that is "one-third heavier".

Obtaining sexual services for oneself without any of the aggravating circumstances (underage victim, trafficking, by fraud, deceit, threat, violence, or the exercise of undue influence or coercion) remains legal and is not subject to punishment under Thai law.

=== Penal Code Amendment Act ===
The Penal Code Amendment Act (No. 14), B.E. 2540 (1997) does not state that prostitution in Thailand is illegal.

However, Title IX, Section 286 of the Penal Code states: "Any person, being over sixteen years of age, [sic] subsists on the earning of a prostitute, even if it is some part of her incomes [sic], shall be punished with imprisonment of seven to twenty years and fined of fourteen thousand to forty thousand Baht, or imprisonment for life." While penalties are not specified, the same section of the act penalizes any person who (i) is found residing or habitually associating with a prostitute, (ii) receives boarding, money or other benefits arranged for by a prostitute or (iii) assists any prostitute in a quarrel with a customer.

The Act was also written to address child prostitution, but lacks complete clarity, as it does not define what an "indecent act" is. Title IX, Section 279 of the Penal Code states: "Whoever, commits an indecent act on a child not yet over fifteen years of age, whether such child shall consent or not, shall be punished with imprisonment not exceeding ten years or fined not exceeding twenty thousand Baht, or both."

=== Entertainment Places Act ===
The Entertainment Places Act of 1966 places the onus upon the owner of certain types of entertainment establishments if prostitution occurs on the premises, thereby making them criminally liable. According to the act, sex workers must also undergo rehabilitation for one year at a reform house upon the completion of punishment for practicing prostitution there.

Related activities such as brothel keeping, solicitation and profiting from the prostitution of others are illegal. Public nuisance laws are also used against prostitution. Prostitution operates clandestinely in many parts of the country.

== Extent ==
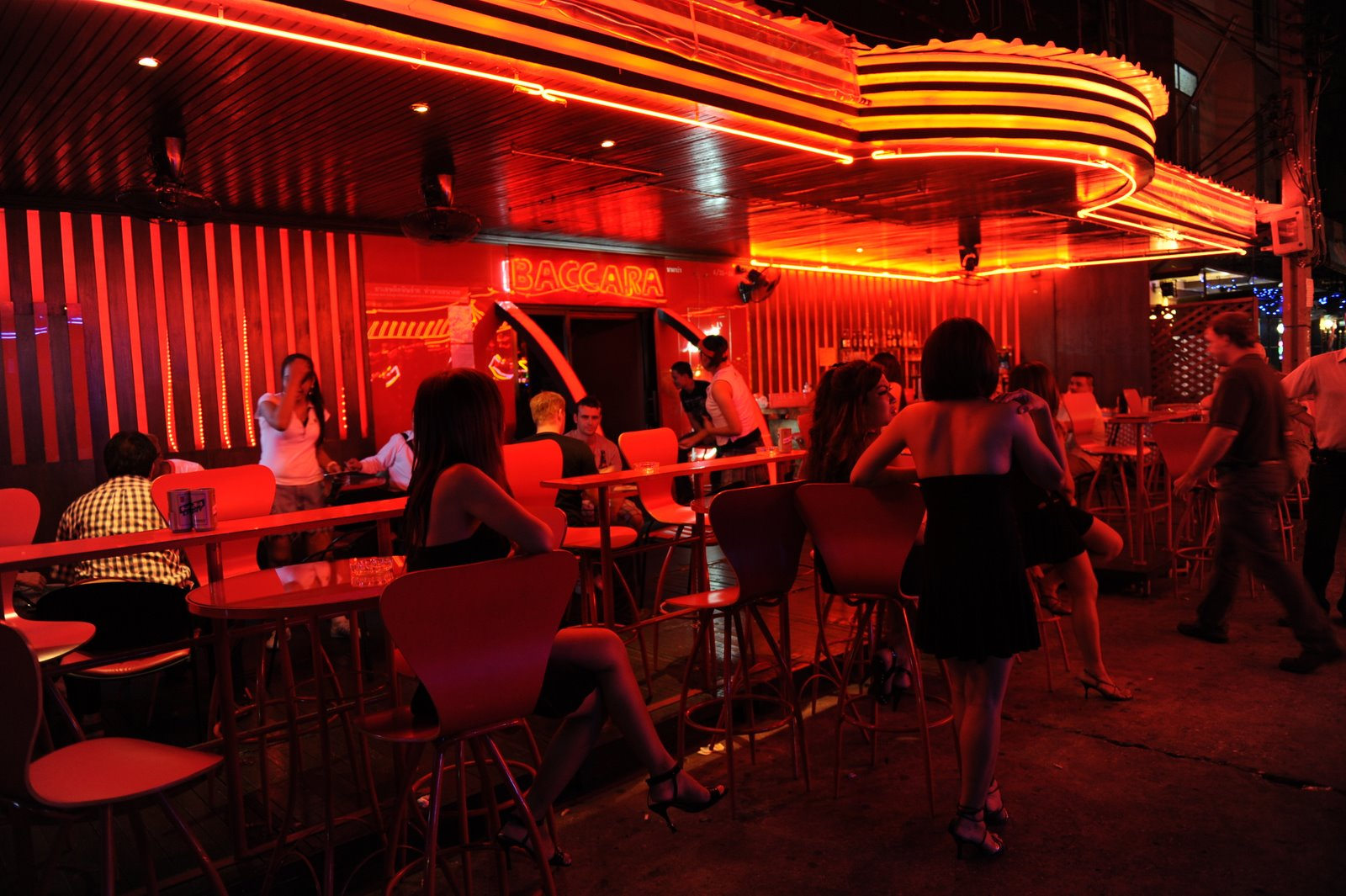
A go-go bar, Soi Cowboy, Bangkok

We [Gambia] are not a sex destination. If you want a sex destination, you go to Thailand.— Hamat Bah, Gambian Tourism Minister commenting in 2018 on local sex tourism trends, provoking a rebuke from Thailand.

Since the Vietnam War, Thailand has gained an international reputation among travellers from many countries as a sex tourism destination. The precise number of prostitutes in Thailand is difficult to assess. Estimates vary widely and are subject to national and international controversy. No Thai government has ever conducted a formal survey. A 2004 estimate by Dr. Nitet Tinnakul of Chulalongkorn University gave a total of 2.8 million sex workers, including two million women, 20,000 adult males, and 800,000 minors under the age of 18, but the figures for women and minors were considered to be grossly inflated by most observers, and to have resulted from poor research methods. According to a 2001 report by the World Health Organization: "The most reliable suggestion is that there are between 150,000 and 200,000 sex workers." In its annual human rights report for 2008, the US State Department noted that, "A government survey during the year found that there were 76,000 to 77,000 adult prostitutes in registered entertainment establishments. However, NGOs believed there were between 200,000 and 300,000 prostitutes." The state department's 2013 Human Rights Report for Thailand made no estimates of the extent of prostitution, but in 2015 Havocscope, a database providing information about the global black market, gave an approximate figure of about 250,000 for the number of prostitutes working in Thailand. UNAIDS in 2015 estimated the total population of sex workers in Thailand to be 147,000.

It has been suggested for example that there may be as many as 10,000 prostitutes on Ko Samui alone, an island resort destination not usually noted for prostitution, and that at least 10 percent of tourist dollars may be spent on the sex trade. A 2022 paper from Chulalongkorn University in Bangkok estimated that 50,000 sex workers were based in Pattaya, giving it one of the largest sex industries in Southeast Asia. An estimate published in 2003 placed the sex trade at US$4.3 billion per year, or about three percent of the Thai economy. In 2015 Havocscope said that about US$6.4 billion in annual revenue was being generated by the trade, a figure which accounted for 1.6 percent of Thailand's GDP. Havocscope says that sex workers in Thailand send an annual average of US$300 million to family members who reside in more rural areas of Thailand.

In 1996, the police in Bangkok estimated that there were at least 5,000 Russian prostitutes working in Thailand, many of whom had arrived through networks controlled by Russian gangs.

In July 2016, it was reported that the Thai government intended to abolish the sex industry. Kobkarn Wattanavrangkul, the tourism minister, said "Tourists don't come to Thailand for [sex]. They come here for our beautiful culture" and that "We want Thailand to be about quality tourism. We want the sex industry gone". Kobkarn was replaced as tourism minister in November 2017. The Royal Thai Police says that more than 24,000 people were arrested, prosecuted and fined for offences related to prostitution in 2019.

The closure of the country's borders in 2020 as a reaction to the COVID-19 pandemic in Thailand resulted in there being few foreign clients for the country's sex workers. 35 percent of them had no access to public cash relief; some were refused government financial aid after they identified themselves as sex workers, while others had to lie about their profession in order to receive payments. Many switched to jobs outside the sex industry. The Department of Women's Affairs and Family Development said that it was providing sex workers with relief supplies and job training. It also said that it was planning to amend the country's prostitution law to allow them to access social welfare benefits, as only 5 percent were part of Thailand's social security system.

== Location ==
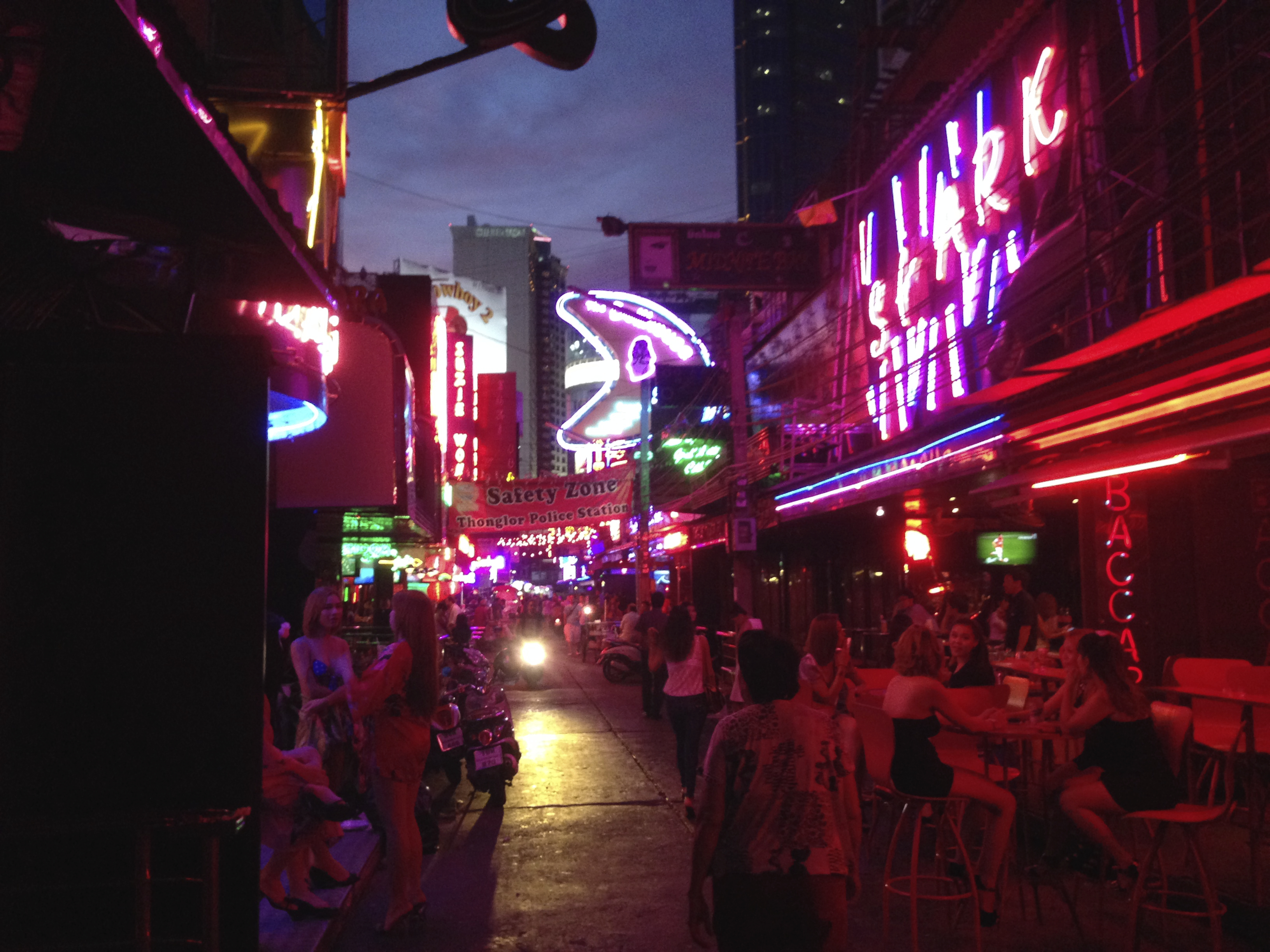
Soi Cowboy, Bangkok

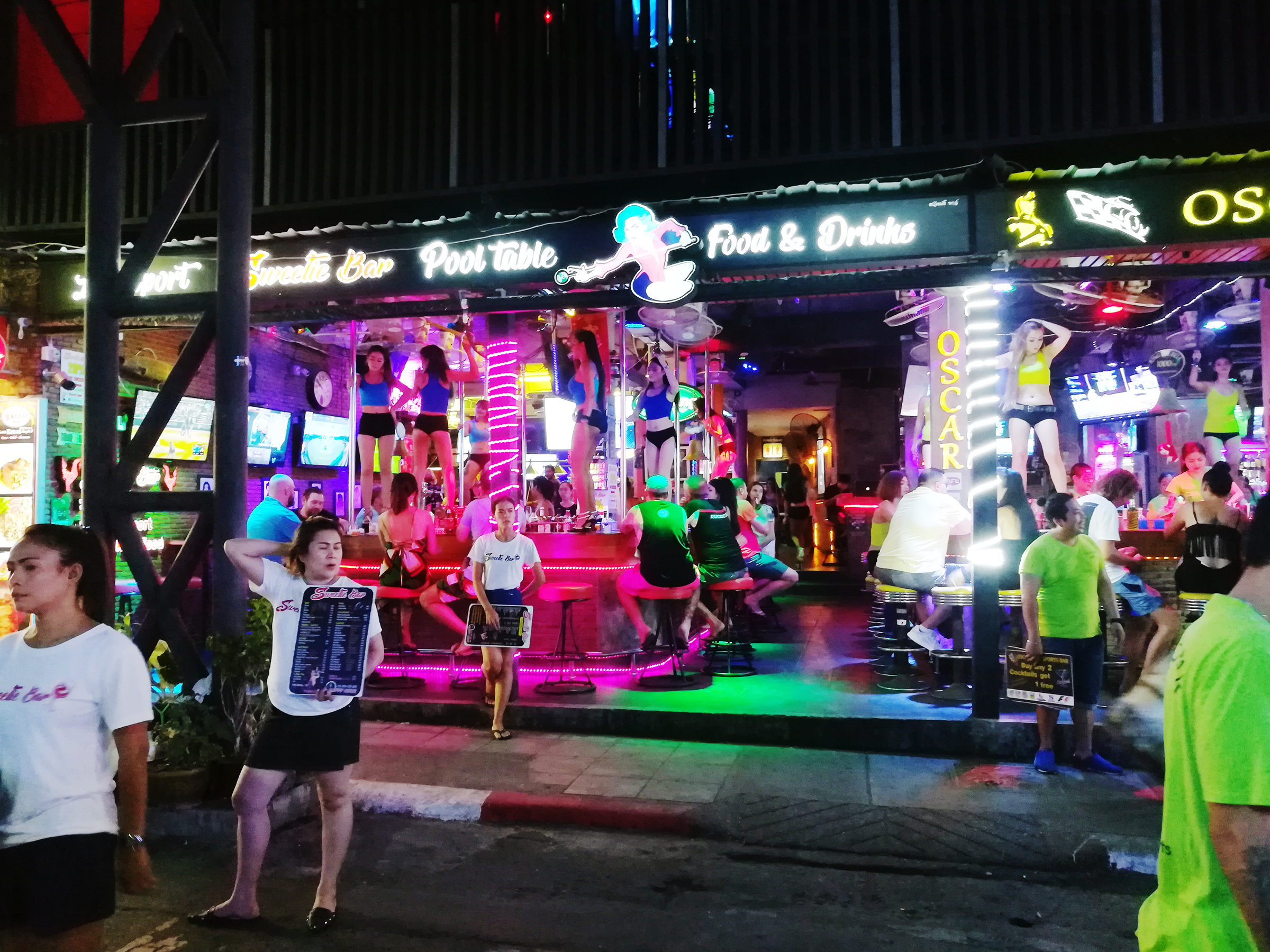
Bars in the town of Patong on Phuket Island

The primary tourist "prostitution zones" of Thailand are often identified as the red-light districts of Bangkok, and Pattaya as well as Patong Beach Resort on Phuket Island. In addition, Hat Yai and other Malaysian border cities cater to Malaysians. In Bangkok, the areas most commonly associated with prostitution include the entertainment district of Patpong, as well as locations in the western Sukhumvit Road area, such as the street called Soi Cowboy and the Nana Plaza building. The area known as the Ratchadaphisek entertainment district, running along Ratchadaphisek Road near the Huai Khwang intersection, is the location of several large entertainment venues, which include sexual massage. Lumphini Park in central Bangkok is well-known as a prostitution spot after dark. In Pattaya the primary areas associated with prostitution are Boyztown, Sunee Plaza and Walking Street.

Rather than face of the risks of working independently, many sex workers choose the relative safety that comes with fixed employment in businesses such as "karaoke" bars, "massage" parlours, or brothels. Prostitution may take place in a number of different types of venues, including brothels, hotels, massage parlours, restaurants, saunas, hostess bars, go-go bars and "beer bars". Many other service sector workers offer sexual services as a sideline. Thai prostitution is divided into different sectors that serve different markets (the main criteria being the socioeconomic status of customers and the nationality of both customers and prostitutes). Straightforward brothels, which offer no services aside from sex, represent the lower end of the market. These are most common outside Bangkok, serving low-income Thai men.

Profiting from prostitution is prohibited under Thai law, but karaoke bars and massage parlours can be registered as normal, legal businesses. When arrests of sex workers occur at such premises, police usually treat the act of prostitution as an exchange between the sex worker and the client—an exchange to which the owner of the business was not a party. Although uncommon, cases of foreign clients being charged have happened, with Pattaya being the location in which most foreigners have been caught up in a police raid. Owners of such establishments are only accused of crimes when breaking other laws, such as the employment of underage workers or illegal migrants.

=== Soapy massage ===
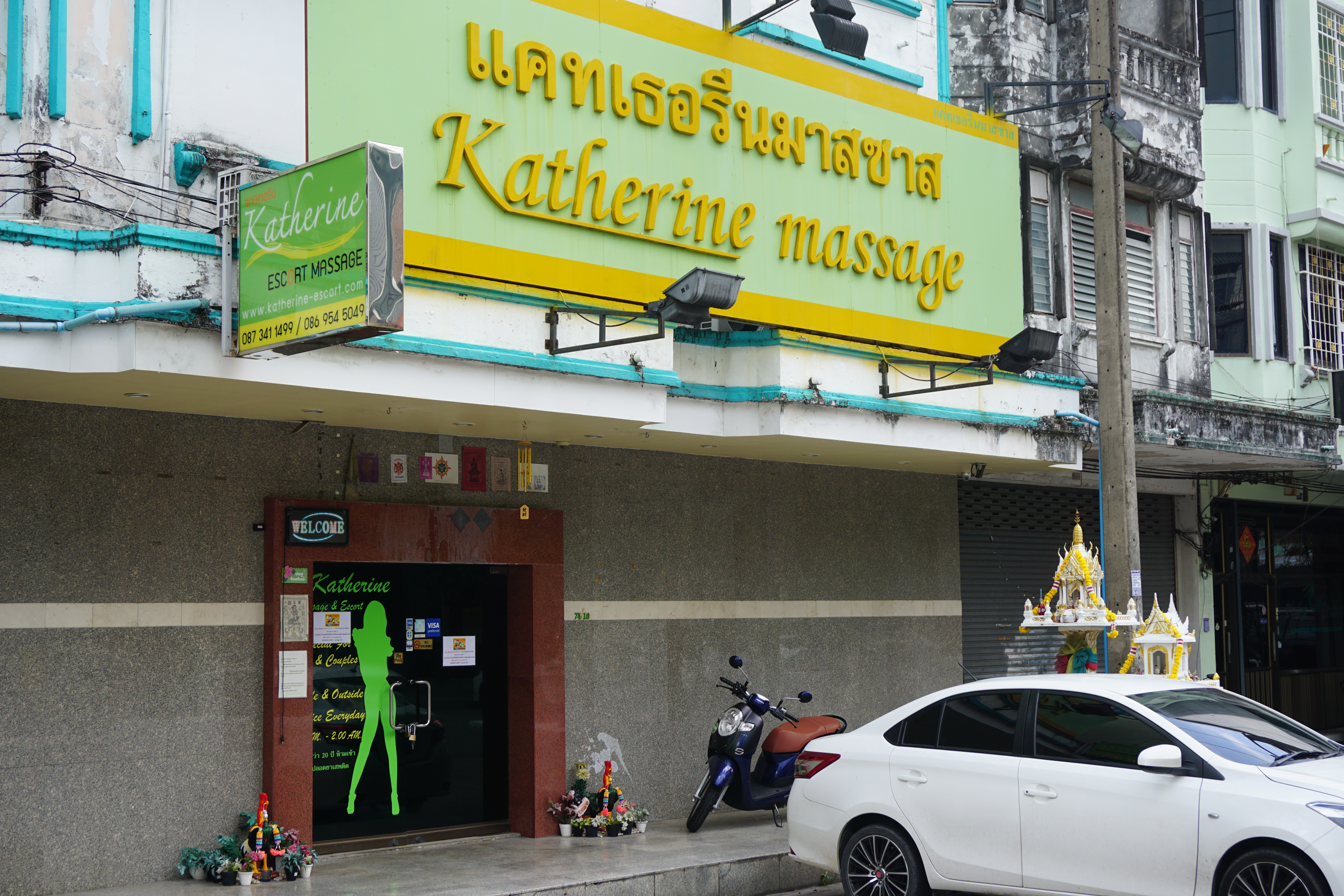
Soapy massage establishment in Phuket City

Soapy massage establishments (Thai: สถานอาบอบนวด; RTGS: sathan ap op nuat, "bathing and massage places"), akin to Japanese soaplands, typically provide either an oil massage, nude body massage, or a bath treatment which includes sexual services. In this type of establishment, male clients can engage in sexual activity with female prostitutes. Prostitution establishments targeted at locals are usually "bathing-sauna-massage" parlours of this type. There are so many soapy massage businesses in some sections of Bangkok, using massive quantities of water pumped illegally from groundwater, that they have been accused by authorities of contributing to Bangkok's subsidence of one centimeter per year.

=== Karaoke bars ===
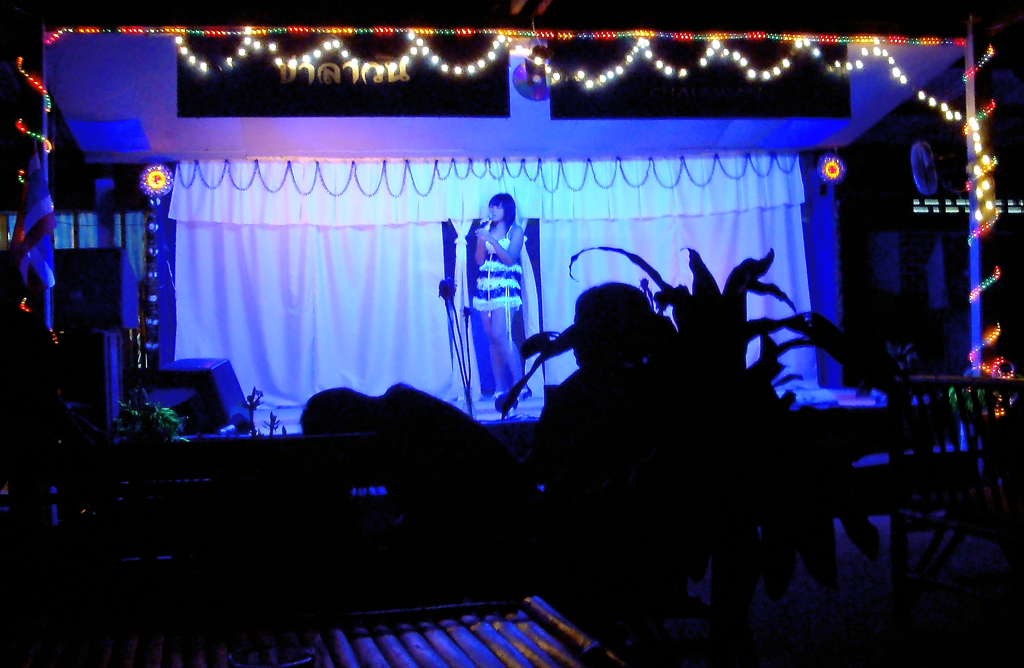
Karaoke bar in Thailand

Karaoke bars are also used as a venue in the country's sex industry, one that is more popular with locals than tourists. Women working there act as bargirls – singing, conversing with and entertaining clients. They earn money from commission on drinks and may be bought money garlands. On some occasions their clients pay a bar fine to take them out of the bar for a girlfriend experience. They may then also negotiate for the sale of sexual services.

One observer says that, "So-called 'karaoke bars' commonly feature karaoke machines as décor, even though few or no customers visit such venues to sing, but rather to buy sex service." In a 2015 study by the Ubon Ratchathani Provincial Health Service, there were 2,410 women working in restaurants and karaoke bars in Ubon Ratchathani Province. Of these, 1,230 were confirmed sex workers. Just over half of them—692 women—were from Laos working illegally in Thailand.

=== Massage parlours ===
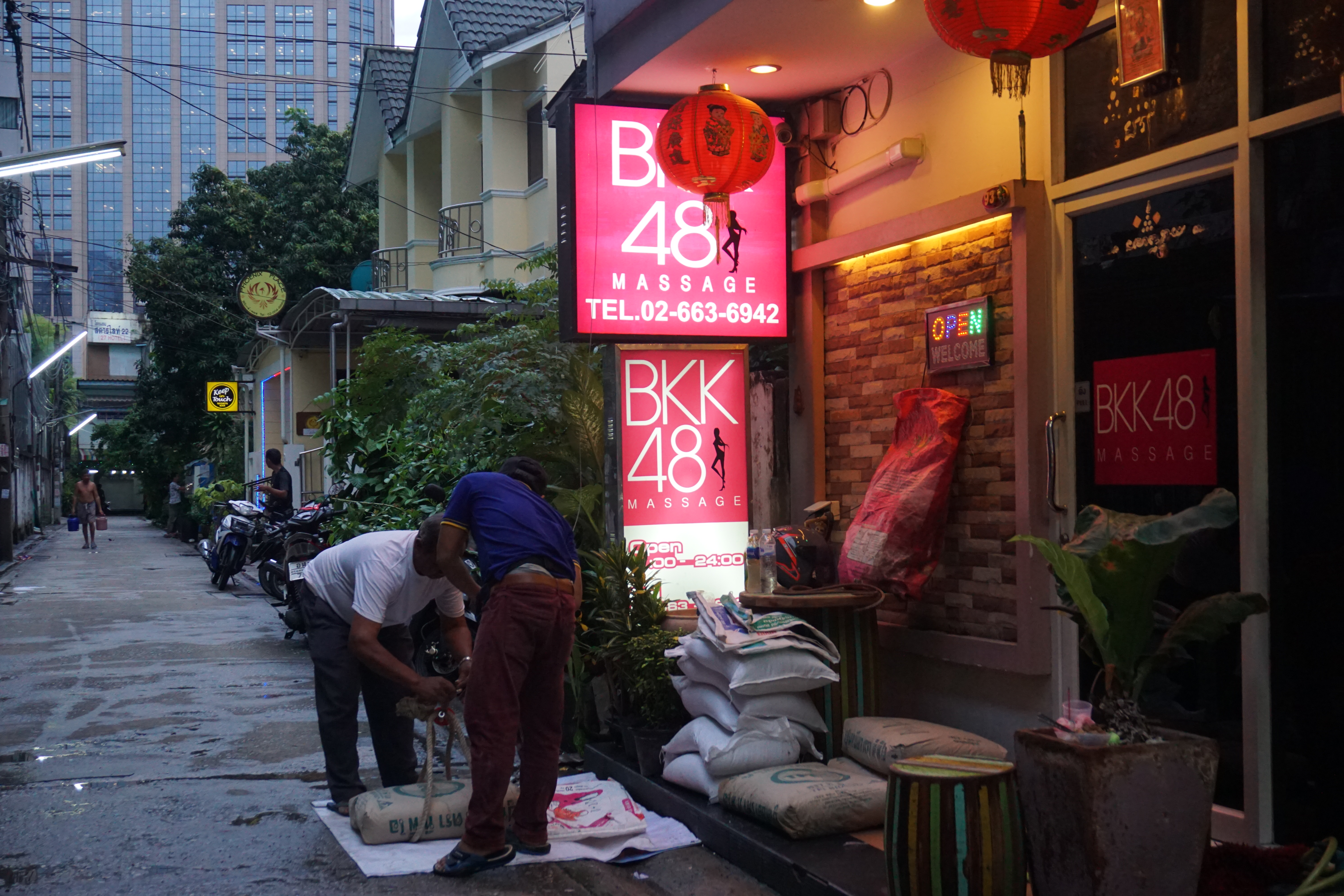
Massage parlor in Bangkok

Although Thailand is known for Thai massage, its non-sexual, traditional style of massage, known as nuat phaen boran, some massage parlours provide customers erotic massage at additional cost including handjobs, oral sex, and sexual intercourse. The Federation of Thai Spa Associations (FTSPA) in 2016 urged authorities to clamp down on sexual services being offered at some massage parlours. The FTSPA maintains that influential figures have used legal loopholes to open "pretty spas" or massage parlours where tourists can buy sexual services. The difference between this type of massage and ab ob nuat is that not all massage parlours offer sexual services.

=== Bars catering to foreigners ===
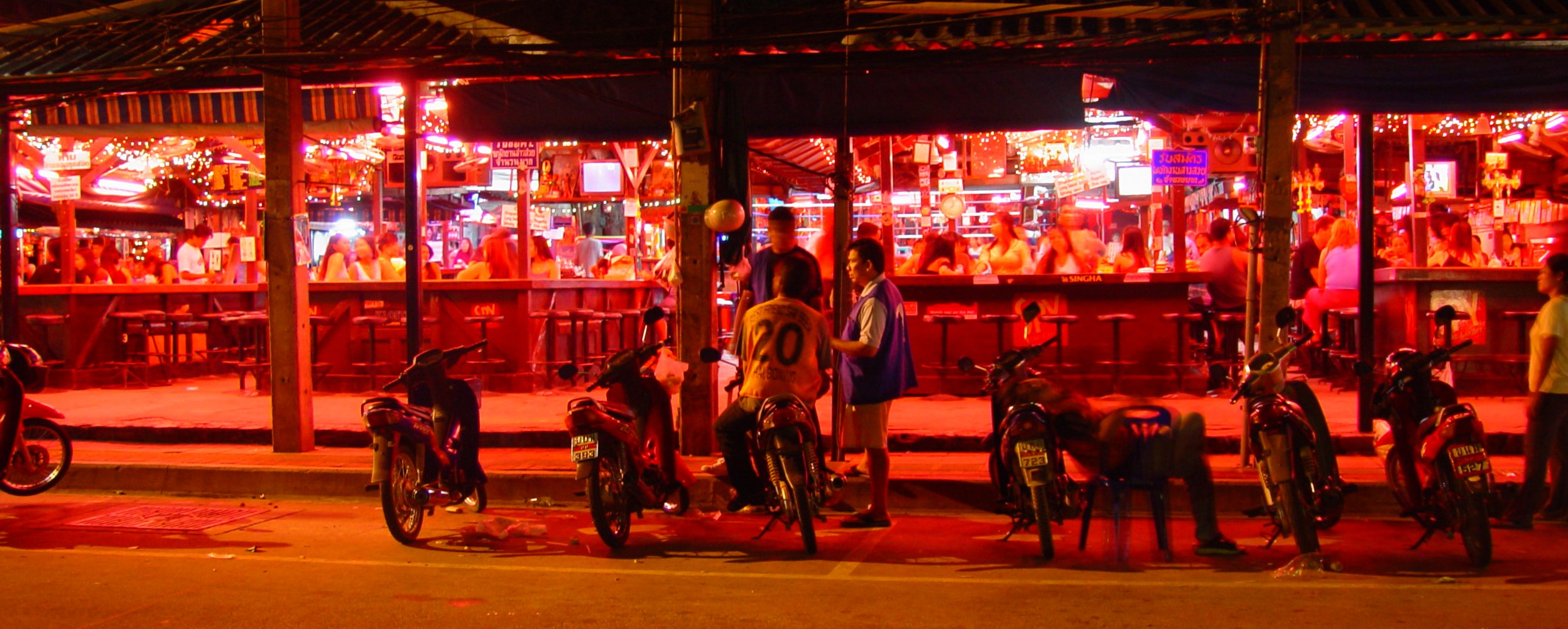
Night bars in Pattaya

Women ("bargirls"), or men, in the case of gay bars, or transsexual ("kathoeys") are employed by the bars either as dancers (in the case of go-go bars) or simply as hostesses who will encourage customers to buy them drinks. Apart from these sorts of bars, there are a number of other sex trade venues. In most of these establishments the prostitutes are directly employed, but in hotels, some bars and discos freelance prostitutes are allowed to solicit clients. Prostitutes will usually receive a commission when a customer buys drinks and sexual services can be arranged to take place on premises or elsewhere (with the latter requiring the customer to pay a "bar fine" to release the prostitute from the bar). The relationships established in such contexts superficially mimic the "dating" culture of the west, with a mix of friendship, intimacy, sexual entertainment, and money.

== History ==
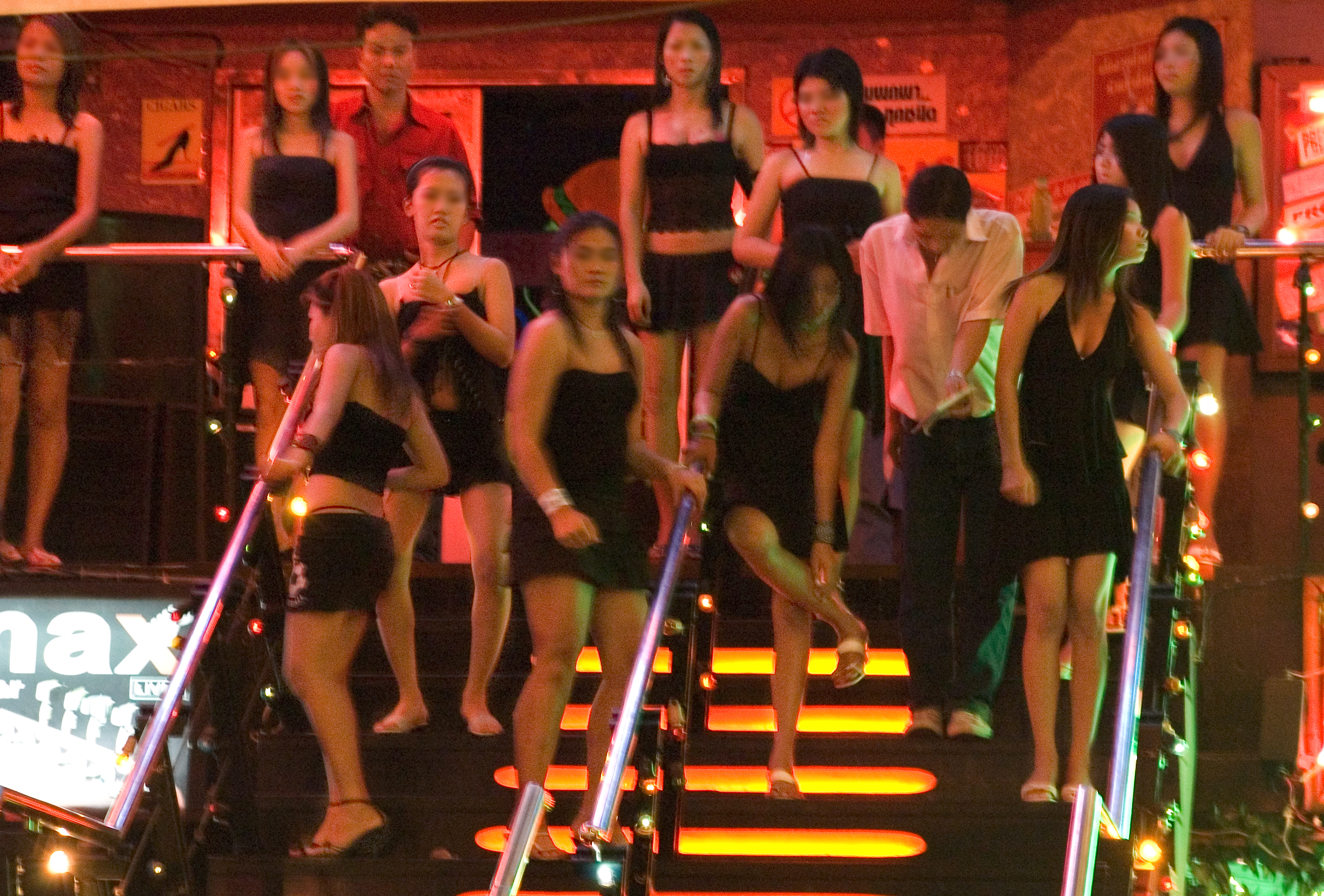
Bargirls awaiting customers, Pattaya

The documented history of prostitution in Thailand goes back at least six centuries, with overt and explicit references by the Chinese voyager Ma Huan (1433) and subsequently by European visitors (Van Neck, 1604; Gisbert Heeck, 1655 and others). Thailand has an ancient, continuous tradition of legal texts, generally described under the heading of Dhammasattha literature (Thai pron., tam-ma-sat), wherein prostitution is variously defined and universally banned. The era of traditional legal texts came to an end in the early 20th century, but these earlier texts were significant in regard to both the writ and spirit of modern legislation.

The abolition of slavery in 1905 left many women who had been bought as concubines in a state of homelessness and unemployment. Many of them became prostitutes, primarily serving migrant Chinese labourers in the country. In 1908 prostitution was legalised and medical care was provided to prostitutes under the Contagious Diseases Prevention Act, one of a variety of laws relating to the sex industry passed during the twentieth century. During World War II, large numbers of brothels were opened to serve occupying Japanese soldiers, and subsequently the British and Indian military stationed in the country after the war had ended. In the 1950s the Thai prime minister Field Marshal Sarit Thanarat initiated a morality campaign which included the aim of criminalising prostitution through the imposition of fines and imprisonment. A system of medical examinations and "moral rehabilitation" was introduced and the focus of public blame was moved from traffickers and procurers to the prostitutes themselves.

During the Vietnam War, Thailand's decision to offer "Rest and Recreation" facilities to US forces deployed in the region brought in considerable income to the country, raising the number of prostitutes there from around 20,000 in 1957 to around 400,000 in 1964. Prostitution itself was made illegal in Thailand in 1960, when a law was passed under pressure from the United Nations. The government instituted a system of monitoring sex workers in order to prevent their mistreatment and to control the spread of sexually transmitted diseases. The Entertainment Places Act was introduced in 1966 to place further restrictions on the sex industry.

During the Cold War, Japanese businessmen went on sex tourism with Filipino women, Thai women and South Korean women.

Since the end of the Vietnam War, there has been an enormous expansion in prostitution in Thailand, resulting in it reaching its present prominence. The 1960 law was repealed by the Prevention and Suppression of Prostitution Act, B.E. 2539 (1996). Under this law prostitution as such is technically illegal.

== Legalization attempt ==
In 2003, the Ministry of Justice considered legalising prostitution as an official occupation with health benefits and taxable income and held a public discussion on the topic. Legalisation and regulation was proposed as a means to increase tax revenue, reduce corruption, and improve the situation of the workers. However, nothing further was done. In 2020, Thai sex workers took part in a campaign for legalization. The Empower Foundation, which supports sex workers, is trying to collect 10,000 signatures so that they can send a petition to parliament. In March 2023, the Ministry of Social Development and Human Security drafted a bill to legalize sex work, proposing to repeal the Prevention and Suppression of Prostitution Act 1996 and allow individuals aged 20 or older to voluntarily enter the sex industry.

== HIV/AIDS ==
In 2008, 532,522 Thais were living with HIV/AIDS. The UNAIDS estimated in 2013 that from 380,000 to 520,000 Thais were living with HIV. In 2017, the number of Thais living with HIV was 440,000. The prevalence of HIV/AIDS among Thai adults aged 15–49 is estimated to be 1.1 percent (2016). Among freelance female sex workers, the prevalence of HIV was 2.8 percent in 2017. Among female sex workers in brothels, it was 0.6 percent (2017).

Mechai Viravaidya, known as "Mr. Condom", has campaigned tirelessly to increase the awareness of safe sex practices and use of condoms in Thailand. He served as minister for tourism and AIDS prevention from 1991 to 1992, and also founded the restaurant chain Cabbages and Condoms, which gives free condoms to customers.

After the enactment of the Thai government's first five-year plan to combat the HIV/AIDS epidemic in the country, including Mechai's "100% condom programme", as of 1994 the use of condoms during commercial sex probably increased markedly. No current data on the use of condoms is available. The programme instructed sex workers to refuse intercourse without a condom, and monitored health clinic statistics in order to locate brothels that allow sex without condoms.

=== Kathoey ===
A study done by AIDS Care investigated substance use of HIV risk behaviors among kathoey sex workers in Bangkok, Thailand. Only half of participants stated that they were tested for HIV and one had seen a health care provider in the past 12 months. It found that katheoys who experienced physical and/or sexual abuse from a father or brother were less likely to use condoms during anal sex with customers. Katheoy sex work tends to be in large cities and tourist areas including Bangkok, Chiang Mai, Phuket City, and Pattaya. Many kathoeys work part-time as freelance prostitutes and keep a day-time job. Female prostitution is often preferred to Kathoey as they are viewed as less likely to carry sexually transmitted diseases. Pressure from often specialized "ladyboy" bars puts kathoeys at risk of contracting sexually transmitted diseases given that many customers are unwilling to use condoms.

== Reasons for prevalence and toleration ==
=== Social views ===
Thai society has its own unique set of often contradictory sexual mores. Visiting a prostitute or a paid mistress is not an uncommon, though not necessarily acceptable, behaviour for men. Many Thai women, for example, believe the existence of prostitution actively reduces the incidence of rape. Among many Thai people, there is a general attitude that prostitution has always been, and will always be, a part of the social fabric of Thailand. On the other hand, "...the idea of legalizing sex work is unacceptable to many Thais who judge the profession to be a foundation of vices. It doesn't matter how many sex workers are left out of the formal economic sector and become more prone to extortion, exploitation and abuse – many Thais simply will not tolerate sex work as legal."

According to a 1996 study, the sexual urge of men is perceived by both Thai men and women as being very much stronger than the sexual urge of women. Where women are thought to be able to exercise control over their desires, the sexual urge of men is seen to be "a basic physiological need or instinct". It is also thought by both Thai men and women that men need "an occasional variation in partners". As female infidelity is strongly frowned upon in Thai society, and, according to a 1993 survey, sexual relationships for single women also meets disapproval by a majority of the Thai population, premarital sex, casual sex and extramarital sex with prostitutes is accepted, expected and sometimes even encouraged for Thai men, the latter being perceived as less threatening to a marriage over lasting relationships with a so-called "minor wife".

Another factor contributing to this issue is that ordinary Thais deem themselves tolerant of other people, especially those whom they perceive as downtrodden. This acceptance has allowed prostitution to flourish without much of the extreme social stigma found in other countries. According to a 1996 study, people in Thailand generally disapprove of prostitution, but the stigma for prostitutes is not lasting or severe, especially since many prostitutes support their parents through their work. Some men do not mind marrying former prostitutes. A 2009 study of subjective well-being of prostitutes found that among the sex workers surveyed, sex work had become normalized.

=== Politicians ===
Chuwit Kamolvisit was the owner of several massage parlours in Bangkok and considered by many a "godfather of prostitution" in Thailand. In 2005 he was elected for a four-year term to the Thai House of Representatives, but in 2006 the Constitutional Court removed him from office. In October 2008 he again ran for governor of Bangkok but was not elected. He revealed in 2003 that some of his best clients were senior politicians and police officers, whom he also claimed to have paid, over a decade, more than £1.5 million in bribes so that his business, selling sex, could thrive.

Although Thailand's sex trade aimed at foreigners can be considered overt, the industry that caters exclusively to Thai men had never before been publicly scrutinised, let alone the sexual exploits of Thailand's unchallengeable officials.

Support of prostitution is pervasive in political circles, as BBC News reported in 2003. "MPs from Thailand's ruling Thai Rak Thai Party are getting hot under the collar over plans by the party leadership to ban them from having mistresses or visiting brothels...." One MP told The Nation newspaper that if the rules were enforced, the party would only be able to field around 30 candidates, compared to its more than 200 sitting MPs."

Attitudes towards women were exemplified by MP Thirachai Sirikhan, quoted in The Nation, "To have a mia noi [mistress] is an individual's right. There should be no problem as long as the politician causes no trouble to his family or society".

After a police raid on some Bangkok parlours where policemen had sex with prostitutes, "Acting Suthisan Police chief Colonel Varanvas Karunyathat defended the police action, saying that the (police) officers involved needed to have sex with the masseuses to gain evidence for the arrest." Apparently, this is standard practice as a separate police force did the same in Pattaya in May 2007.

=== Organized crime ===
According to a Library of Congress study published in 2003, "The red-light districts of Thai cities are home to...brothels, casinos, and entertainment facilities that function both as sources of income and as operations centers for trafficking in humans...." It has been estimated that organised crime groups have brought over a million women into Thailand from Yunnan in China, Laos, and Vietnam. Most of the women trafficked from China to Thailand and Malaysia are from ethnic minorities like the Dai ethnicity from areas like the from Xishuangbanna Dai Autonomous Prefecture in Yunnan province and they are trafficked by men of their own ethnicity. The Dai people are related to Thai people.

In November 2015, Prime Minister Prayut Chan-o-cha launched a "clean up Thailand" campaign to eliminate organised crime in all areas, including vice.

=== Religion ===
Buddhism in Thailand is largely of the Theravada school, which is followed by 95 percent of the population. "While Buddhism regards the celibate monastic life as the higher ideal, it also recognizes the importance of marriage as a social institution." Thai Buddhism encourages adherence to the fundamental code of Buddhist ethics for the laity. The Five Precepts contains an admonishment against sexual misconduct, although what constitutes misconduct from the perspective of a particular school of Buddhism varies widely depending on the local culture. In the traditional Pāli Canon, the Sigālovāda Sutta contains a large section which advises men on honoring their wives by remaining faithful.

In the book Disposable People: New Slavery in the Global Economy, Kevin Bales argues that in Thai Buddhism, women are viewed as naturally inferior to men, and that Buddha told his disciples that women were "impure, carnal, and corrupting." This is also supported by the belief that women cannot attain enlightenment, although this view is disputed by other Buddhist scriptures such as the Vinaya Pitaka in the Pali Canon. The current Dalai Lama has asserted that women can attain enlightenment and function as equals to men in spiritual matters, but his branch of Buddhism is not the one practised in Thailand, which has its own particular canon of beliefs. Bales also points to the fact that ten kinds of wives are outlined in the Vinaya, or rules for monks. In the rules, the first three categories are women who can be paid for their services. In present-day Thailand, this is expressed as tolerance of prostitution by married women. Sex with prostitutes is viewed by wives as "empty sex", and thus women may allow their husbands to have meaningless sex with prostitutes rather than find a new spouse.

Buddhism also prescribes "acceptance and resignation in the face of life's pain and suffering", in accordance with belief in karma and the expiation of sins from previous lives. Women may choose to believe that serving as prostitutes is the ineluctable result of karma.

=== Exploitation by police and officialdom ===
Prostitution's tenuous position in Thai society makes it ripe for exploitation by police and governmental officials. Sex businesses pay considerable sums to authorities in order to be permitted to continue in business. Sex work has become in effect a cash cow for those in a position to extract bribes. Those in a position to benefit have a financial interest in seeing the status quo continue. Business owners and individual sex workers complain that since the junta came to power in 2014, harassment has increased, as have the sums demanded. This has the effect of driving businesses out of business and sex workers to the street or internet as freelancers.

== Crime ==
=== Child prostitution ===
The exact number of child-prostitutes in Thailand is not known. According to the US-based research institute "Protection Project", estimates of the number of children involved in prostitution living in Thailand ranges from 12,000 to the hundreds of thousands (ECPAT International). The government, university researchers, and NGOs estimated that there are as many as 30,000 to 40,000 prostitutes under 18 years of age, not including foreign migrants (US Department of State, 2005b). Thailand's Health System Research Institute estimates that children in prostitution make up 40% of prostitutes in Thailand.

The reasons why and how children are commercially sexually exploited by include:

- Poverty: a high proportion of the population lives in poverty.
- Ethnic hill tribe children: these children live in the border region of northern Thailand. They suffer from disproportionate levels of poverty in relation to the general population and most of them lack citizenship cards. This means that they do not have access to health care or primary school, which limits their further education or employment opportunities.
- Trafficked children: Many children are trafficked into or within the country through criminal networks, acquaintances, former trafficking victims and border police and immigration officials who transport them to brothels across Thailand.
- Sense of duty: According to traditional customs, the first duty of a girl is to support her family in any way she can. Due to this sense of duty and to pay off family debts, many girls have been forced into prostitution.

Children are exploited in sex establishments and are also approached directly in the street by paedophiles seeking sexual contact. Child sex tourism is a serious problem in the country. Thailand, along with Cambodia, India, Brazil and Mexico, has been identified as a leading hotspot of child sexual exploitation. Paedophiles, in particular, exploit the lax laws of the country and attempt to find cover to avoid prosecution.

To discourage child sex tourism, the government reported it denied entry to 74 known foreign sex offenders in 2017. The government has developed and launched a video to be shown on flights entering Thailand discouraging sex tourism. The Ministry of Tourism distributed more than 315,000 brochures discouraging sex tourism to businesses and tourism professionals and organized trainings for 800 local government officials, tourism sector workers, students, youth, and civil society organizations on prevention of child sexual exploitation in the tourism industry.

=== Sex trafficking ===
Thailand is a source, destination, and transit country for men, women, and children subjected to sex trafficking. Thailand's commercial sex industry remains vast, increasing vulnerabilities for sex trafficking. Women, men, boys, and girls from Thailand, other Southeast Asian countries, Sri Lanka, Russia, Uzbekistan, and some African countries are subjected to sex trafficking in Thailand. Thailand is also a transit country for victims from Mainland China, North Korea, Vietnam, Bangladesh, India, and Burma subjected to sex trafficking in countries such as Malaysia, Indonesia, Singapore, Russia, South Korea, the United States, and countries in Western Europe. Thai nationals are subjected to sex trafficking in Thailand and in countries in North America, Europe, Africa, Asia, and the Middle East.

Women of Thai and other nationalities have been lured to Japan and sold to yakuza-controlled brothels, where they are forced to work off financial debt. It is easy to lure these women from neighboring countries because Thailand has 56 unofficial crossover points and 300 checkpoints, where people can cross the border without paperwork. In a landmark case in 2006, one such woman, Urairat Soimee, filed a civil suit in Thailand against the Thai perpetrators, who had previously been convicted in a criminal court. The woman had managed to escape from the yakuza-controlled prostitution ring by killing the female Thai mama-san and spent five years in a Japanese prison.

The United States Department of State Office to Monitor and Combat Trafficking in Persons in its 2018 U.S. Trafficking in Persons report considered Thailand to be a Tier 2 country, meaning the report states that although the Government of Thailand does not fully meet the minimum standards for the elimination of trafficking, it is making significant efforts to do so.

Thailand has enacted several laws against human trafficking. These include the 2008 Anti Trafficking in Persons Act, and the 1997 Anti Trafficking Act. Thailand has also entered into regional agreements against human trafficking, including The Coordinated Mekong Ministerial Initiative against Trafficking. Thai sex worker organization EMPOWER has expressed several concerns about the 2008 law. These concerns include that the law authorizes police to enter alleged sex establishments without a warrant, the lack of social assistance provided to victims, involutary repatriations, and the resulting division between NGOs which claim to oppose sex trafficking and those which support sex workers themselves. Sex worker organizations in Thailand have strongly opposed "rescue" operations which result in adults who freely entered the sex industry being arrested, denied a livelihood, or subject to deportation.

A sex trafficking gang was intercepted in the southern city of Pattaya in October 2014.

In 2017, Ministry of the Interior and Ministry of Justice inspected 11,268 "high-risk" adult entertainment venues and ordered 268 to cease business activities for five years; these inspections led to the prosecution of eight trafficking cases. Corruption continues to undermine anti-trafficking efforts. Some government officials are directly complicit in trafficking crimes, including through accepting bribes or loans from business owners and brothels where victims are exploited. Credible reports indicate some corrupt officials protect brothels and other commercial sex venues from raids and inspections and collude with traffickers.

== Support organisations for sex workers ==
Several support organisations for sex workers exist in Thailand:

- EMPOWER is a Thai NGO that offers health, educational and counseling services to female sex workers. The organisation seeks to empower sex workers and has been operating since 1985, with offices in Patpong (Bangkok), Chiang Mai, Mae Sai and Patong Beach (Phuket). The organization also operates a museum of sex work in Bangkok and a cooperatively owned bar in Chiang Mai.
- SWING (Service Workers in Group) is an offshoot of EMPOWER, offering support to male and female sex workers in Patpong and Pattaya. It offers English classes, teaches safe sex education, distributes condoms, and promotes health and safety with an in-house gym and discounted medical examinations. The newly formed organisation SISTERS works with transgender sex workers in Bangkok and Pattaya. On 18 July 2024, the SWING Foundation submitted a proposal backed by 14,484 voters to repeal Thailand's 1996 Prevention and Suppression of Prostitution Act in July. The proposal argues that the law, unchanged for 28 years, criminalizes sex work, pushing it underground while depriving workers of labor protections and healthcare and subsequently contributing to human trafficking.
- M Plus is an organization for male sex workers in Chiang Mai, including men who identify as gay, straight or transgender. It operates a health clinic for sex workers and conducts HIV prevention and prophylaxis education.
- The Asia Pacific Network of Sex Workers (APNSW) is a regional organization, headquartered in Thailand, of sex worker-led organizations. It exists to promote and protect the health and human rights of sex workers in Asia. It supports the full decriminalization of sex work and the recognition of sex work as work.

== See also ==
- Ping pong show
- Prostitution in Cambodia
- Prostitution in India
- Prostitution in Indonesia
- Prostitution in Laos
- Prostitution in Philippines
- Prostitution in Vietnam
- Tourism in Thailand
- Urairat Soimee
