= Ryckman =

Ryckman its traditional Dutch Spelling is "Rijckman". The English versions dropped the "Ij" and it was replaced with a Y as the dutch handwriting looks like a y that is why now the surname is spelled Ryckman is a surname from Old German with a meaning related to "power"; English versions of the surname include Rickman and Rick. "Ryckman" is also a Dutch surname arising as a nickname for a rijc man (rich man).

Among the notable people who share this surname are (organized by birth century):

17th Century

- Albert Janse Ryckman (1642–1737), American businessman and politician

19th Century

- Edmond Baird Ryckman (1866–1934), Canadian politician
- Samuel Shobal Ryckman (1849–1929), Canadian businessman and politician

20th Century

- Billy Ryckman (born 1955), former professional American football player
- Larry Ryckman (born 1959), Canadian-American entertainment, technology and sports entrepreneur
- Richard M. Ryckman (1937–2017), American psychologist and textbook author
- Ron Ryckman Sr. (born 1948), American politician
- Ron Ryckman Jr., (born 1971), American politician

== See also ==
- Ryckmans
- Ryckman Park, public park located on Ocean Avenue in Melbourne Beach, Florida on the Indian River
- Ryckman Corners, Ryckman's Corners, a rural hamlet, is located south of Hamilton at Rymal Road and Upper James. Ryckman's Corners was first settled in the late 1790s, It is named after the Ryckman family, one of the earliest settlers on the mountain. Ryckman Corners is located near Hamilton, Ontario, Canada.

<https://www.thespec.com/news-story/2243505-time-capsule-vintage-photos-from-ryckman-s-corners/>
