= Ryckmans =

Ryckmans is a surname, and may refer to:

- Hélène Ryckmans (born 1959), Belgian politician
- Pierre Ryckmans (1935-2014), Pen name Simon Leys. Belgian-Australian writer and sinologist
- Pierre Ryckmans (1891-1959), Belgian civil servant and colonial head of Burundi and Congo

== See also ==
- Ryckman
- Rickmansworth
