= Michel Désautels =

Canadian writer and journalist

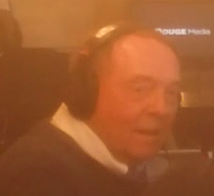
Michel Désautels photographed in Montréal, Québec, Canada during a radio show taping of the CBC's La soirée est encore jeune inside the bar Chez Roger

Michel Désautels (born May 7, 1951) is a Canadian writer and journalist, best known as the host of Désautels, the afternoon news and information program on the Première Chaîne radio network from 2003 to 2013.

He announced in May 2013, soon after returning from a six-month leave of absence for health reasons, that he would be retiring from the daily program, instead launching a new Sunday morning program for the network (which was relaunched as "Ici Radio-Canada Première") in fall 2013. The new program, Désautels le dimanche, debuted in fall 2013.

He has also published two novels, Smiley (1998) and La Semaine prochaine, je veux mourir (2000).

He was formerly married to broadcaster Chantal Jolis from 1980 to 1990.
