= Chantal Jolis =

- Born: 29 April 1947; Grenoble, Isère, France
- Died: 27 February 2012 (aged 64); Bassin, Îles-de-la-Madeleine, Québec, Canada
- Occupations: Radio host, television host, DJ
- Years active: 1970–2010
- Known for: Bouchée double; L'Oreille musclée; Bachibouzouk; Les îles jolies

Chantal Jolis (29 April 1947, in Grenoble, France – 27 February 2012, in Îles-de-la-Madeleine) was a radio host in Québec, Canada. She was best known for her daily broadcasts Bouchée double, L'Oreille musclée and Bachibouzouk presented on Première chaîne of Radio Canada, and for her dynamic, laid-back and accessible style.

== Biography ==
Chantal Jolis was born in Grenoble, France. Her mother was of Italian origin and her father had Spanish lineage. She became a host on France Inter Paris public radio but felt she was only "tolerated" by her superiors. While taking part in a French-language public-radio exchange program in 1980, Jolis visited Québec for two weeks at the age of 33. She felt very welcome in Montréal, where her open-minded and lively tone was appreciated. Radio-Canada offered her a contract and she made Canada her new home.

Upon her arrival in 1980 in Québec, Jolis exhibited great passions: reading, cinema, music, and a love of people, of life, and humour, creating a soothing atmosphere on her programmes. Journalist Nathalie Petrowski called her "a breath of fresh air for our public radio [...] with spontaneity light years away from the psycho-rigidity Radio-Canada of the time." First in the afternoon, co-hosting Bouchées doubles with Jean-François Doré, and solo with C'est du Jolis. Then, in L'oreille musclée, broadcast weekdays from 1983 to 1986 at the end of the morning, she reinvented the morning box and set the way for those who succeeded her.

In 1986 Guy Fournier created a late-night talk show for Jolis, Jolis à croquer, on Télévision Quatre-Saisons. The series did not have the expected success with an indifferent television audience that was rebuffed by Jolis' "French accent of France", her culture and style. Jolis attempted to return to radio but found Radio-Canada hesitant, unused to private sector raiding at that time. After several years, Jolis was employed to temporarily fill-in for the programmes of others. Disappointed, Jolis agreed in 1991 to co-host a noon radio programme at CKAC with Jean Cournoyer, but was released after a year. When she gained a program at Radio-Canada, it was "reduced in scope, away from prime time", with C'est du Jolis which ran from December 1999 through 2000.

On Société Radio-Canada (SRC, French-language CBC television), Jolis conducted numerous sessions of film criticism with René Homier-Roy on the show À première vue, 1982–1989. She also held several memorable interviews, including with Léo Ferré, Serge Gainsbourg and (a few days before his death in the summer of 1988) Félix Leclerc.

== Music and Les îles jolies ==
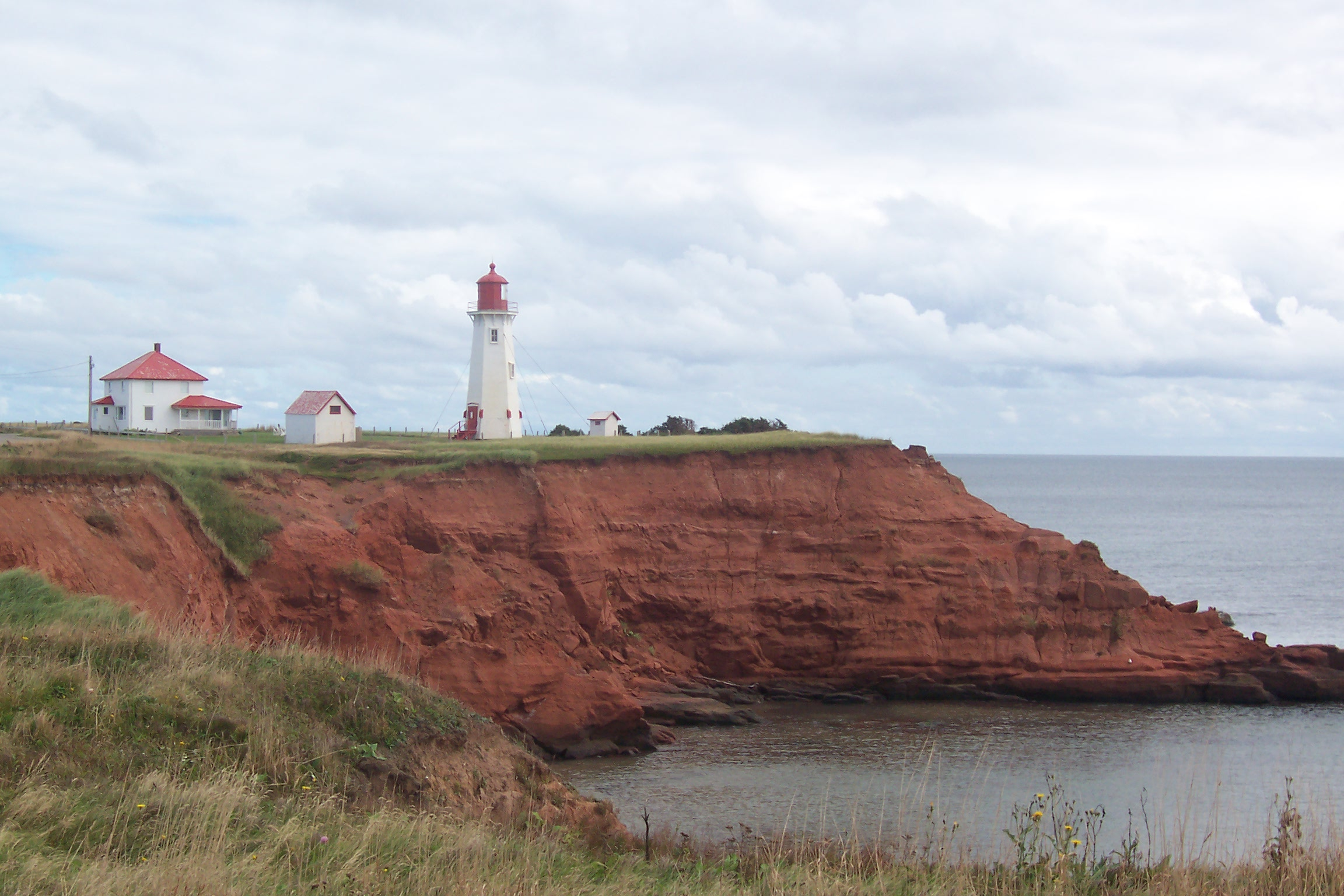
Lighthouse of Anse-à-la-Cabane, in Bassin, on the south-west coast of Île du Havre Aubert

Starting in the summer of 2002, Jolis hosted and produced Les îles jolies from her home in the Magdalen Islands. This was followed by Un petit air de samedi soir (A little air on Saturday night), Bachibouzouk and Quand le chat n'est pas là (When the cat is away).

She also created Espace Musique on the world music web-radio channel of Radio-Canada. At the end of 2007, at the age of 60, Jolis was diagnosed with Parkinson's disease. In 2009 the symptoms of this disease forced her retirement from Espace Musique though she hoped for a cure or treatment that could allow her to return to the microphone.

Of a family of Catholic origin, she had spent her childhood in a religious school network in France. "I believed in God, without loving religion. I was lost and revolted," Jolis said in a September 2007 interview to Le Devoir. She had revealed on Première chaîne's Pour la suite des choses that she had converted to Islam on the occasion of a trip to Morocco for a festival of sacred music.

Jolis died of Parkinson's disease on 27 February 2012, in the Magdalen Islands, where she had made her home in June 2011. She was buried there on 2 March at the cemetery of Havre-Aubert. Jolis was survived by her mother Solange (died 28 March 2013), her two sons, Saddia and Alexis (the latter, from her marriage with the journalist and host Michel Désautels), and six grandchildren.

Chantal a fait exploser la radio avec son ouverture, son style dynamique et un ton qui n'avait jamais été entendu ici. Elle était venue pour deux semaines et le standard téléphonique ne dérougissait plus. Les gens de Radio-Canada lui ont offert un contrat. Le temps d'aller chercher son fils Saddie et ses affaires en France et elle est revenue.

—Michel Désautels
Translation:

Chantal blew up the radio with her openness, dynamic style and a tone that had never been heard here. She had come for two weeks and the switchboard was no longer flashing. The people from Radio-Canada offered her a contract. Time to go get her son, Saddie, and her business in France and she came back.

== Works ==
=== Radio ===
- Bouchée double, Première chaîne
- L'Oreille musclée, Première chaîne
- Bachibouzouk, Première chaîne
- À Indicatif Présent (literary review), Première chaîne

=== Television ===
- À première vue (1982–1989), with René Homier-Roy, SRC
- Jolis à croquer (1986), TQS

=== Film ===
- Le Jouet (1976) French film by Francis Veber with Pierre Richard
