= Raymond and Monique Martinot =

French couple

Raymond and Monique (née Leroy) Martinot were a French couple whose quest for cryonic preservation came to an end after a freezer malfunction in 2006.

After Madame Martinot died from ovarian cancer in 1984, her widower, a doctor who once taught medicine in Paris, preserved her body in the cellar of their home, sparking a legal battle due to French legal restrictions on the disposal of corpses. Dr. Martinot also spent decades preparing for his own death. He held to the idea that if he were frozen and preserved, eventually he could be brought back to life by 2050 with the help of expanded scientific knowledge. In the 1970s, he bought a château near Saumur in the Loire Valley and began preparing a steel freezer unit in the chateau's freezer for himself.

The legal battle extended to encompass Raymond's corpse after he died following a stroke in 2002, with a court ruling that the bodies must be buried. Their bodies were cremated by their son Remy after a malfunction saw their body temperatures rise to -20 °C from -65 °C for a period of several days.
