= Patong =

Patong ป่าตอง
- Town Municipality
- Patong Town Municipality
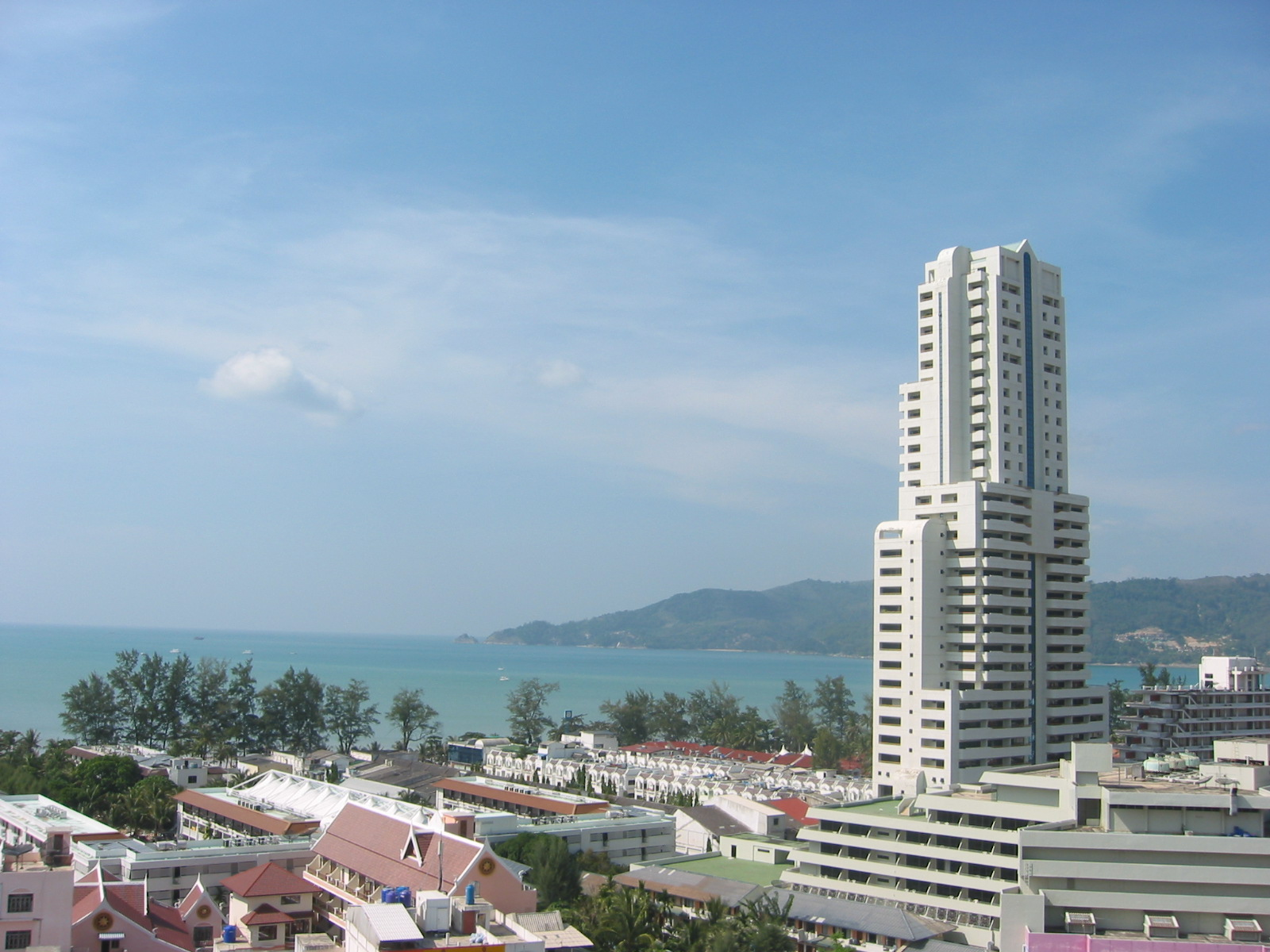

- Patong
- Coordinates: 7°53′35″N 98°17′54″E
- Country: Thailand
- Province: Phuket
- District: Kathu
- Sub-district: Patong

Area
  - Town Municipality: 16.4 km^{2} (6.3 sq mi)
  - Metro: 67.09 km^{2} (25.90 sq mi)

Population
  - Town Municipality: 19,346
  - Density: 1,180/km^{2} (3,060/sq mi)
  - Metro: 59,261
- Registered residents only
- Time zone: UTC+7 (ICT)

Patong (Thai: ป่าตอง RTGS: Pa Tong, pronounced [pàː tɔ̄ːŋ]) refers to the beach and town on Phuket's west coast. It is the main tourist resort on the island of Phuket, and is the centre of Phuket's nightlife and shopping. The beach became popular with Western tourists, especially Europeans, in the late-1980s. It has numerous hotels and the area has expanded into a tourist place. Bangla Road is a popular street in this area with vibrant nightlife.

== History ==
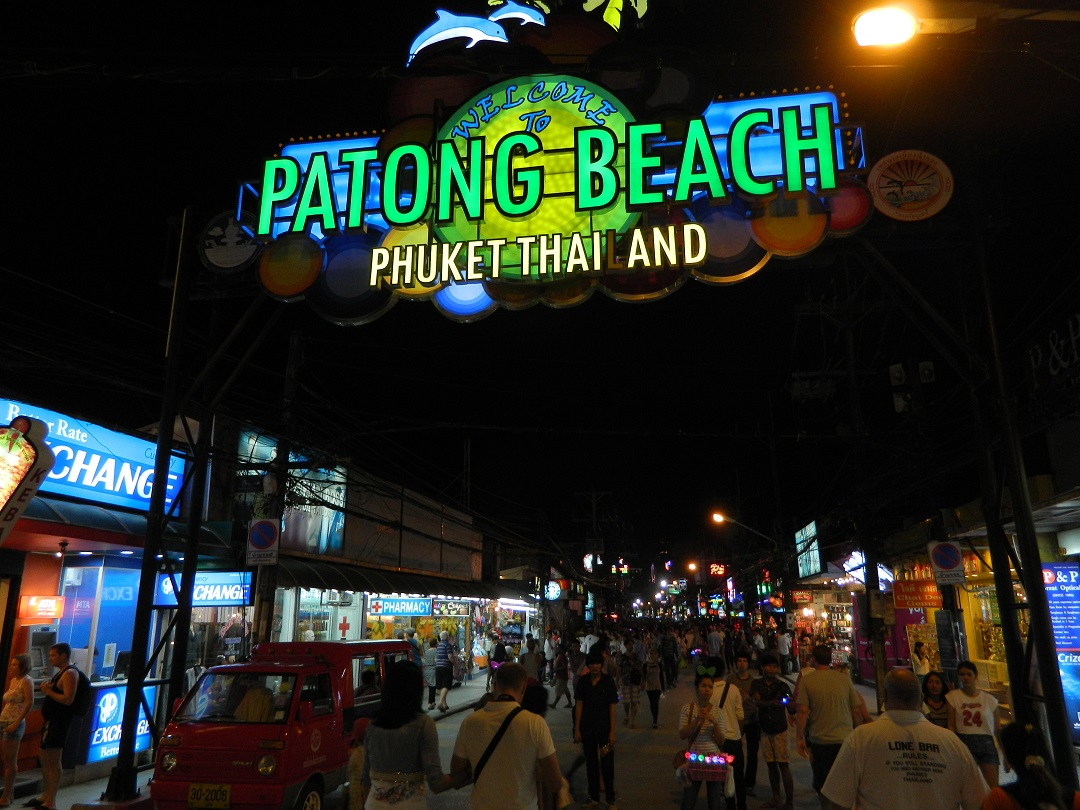
Bangla Road, Patong Beach Walking Street, 2013

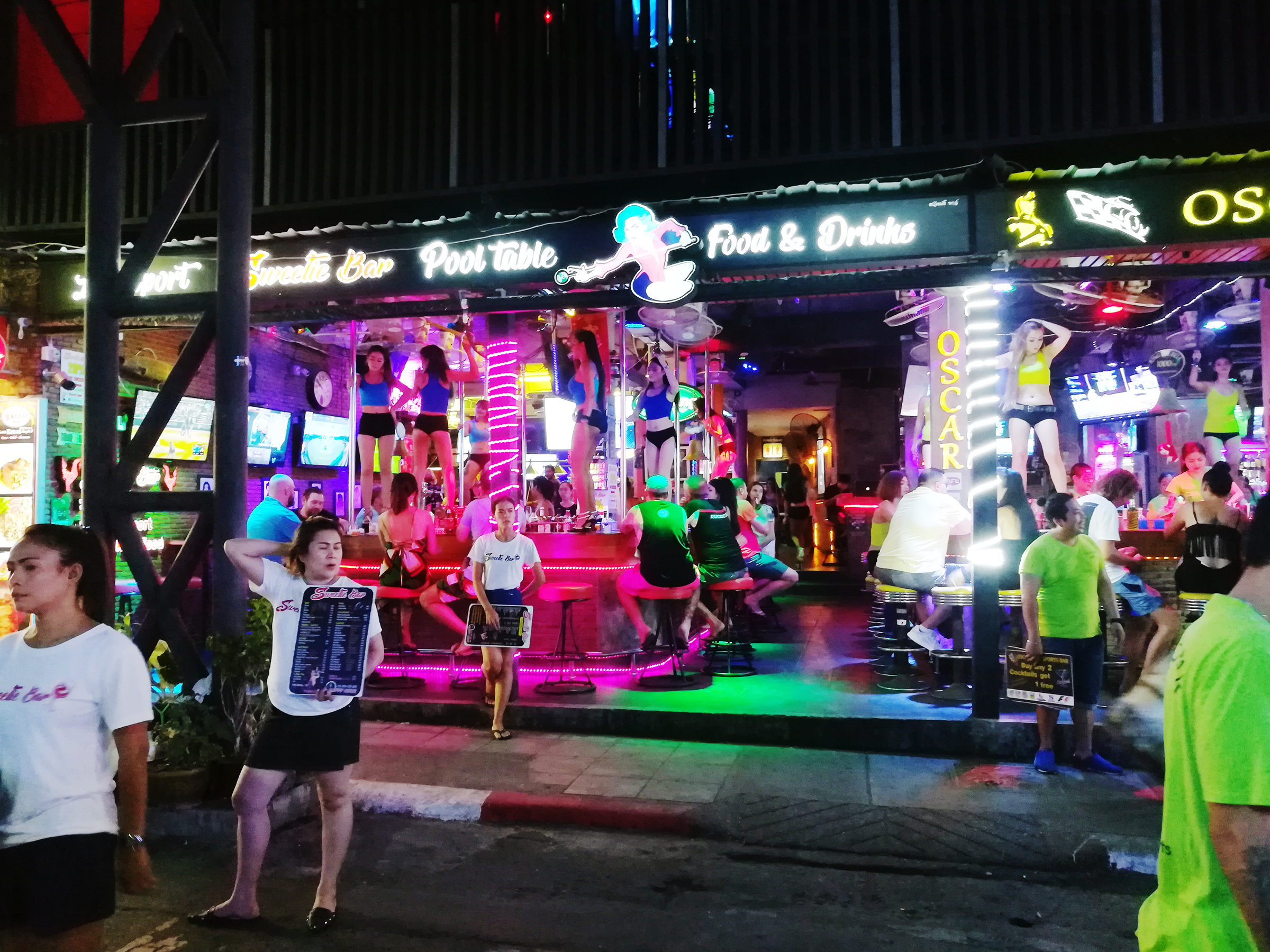
Bars along Bangla Road, Patong (2018)

Patong Beach is known for its nightlife and 2850-metre (1.77 mile) beach that runs the entire length of Patong's west side. Nightlife is centered in two main areas, Bangla Road and the "Paradise Complex", with Bangla Road being predominantly straight and Paradise Complex gay. Both are lined with many bars, discotheques, and go go bars. Prostitution in Thailand is illegal, but tolerated, as is the case in Patong. Cannabis is also commonly sold at shops in Patong.

On 26 December 2004, Patong Beach along with many other areas along the west coast of Phuket and Thailand were struck by a tsunami caused by the 2004 Indian Ocean earthquake. The wave caused a great deal of destruction to the waterfront of the beach and immediately inland and only one woman was killed in a basement seafront grocery store. Patong was one of the worst affected areas of Phuket, although the destruction was not as bad as nearby Khao Lak. Patong has largely recovered since the tsunami.

== Environment ==
As of 2015 the waters off Patong Beach exceeded Thai Pollution Control Department standards for fecal coliform bacteria (FCB) and enterococci bacteria. To avoid paying the municipal wastewater treatment fee of five baht per cubic meter, many households discharge their wastewater untreated into canals and the sea. Patong also has limited capacity to treat wastewater. The municipal wastewater treatment plant is nearing its capacity of 28,000 m^{3} a day. An upgrade be operational in 2018 which will increase capacity by an extra 9,000 m^{3} per day.

=== Municipality's Efforts to Maintain Cleanliness at Patong Beach in Phuket ===
Patong Beach, attracting a large number of visitors every day. Unfortunately, this influx of tourists can sometimes lead to pollution and garbage on the beach.

=== Nightlife ===
Bangla is considered as the most popular walking street in Phuket. Along the street is full of beer bars and go-go bars, which makes tourists stay there longer or in a whole night.

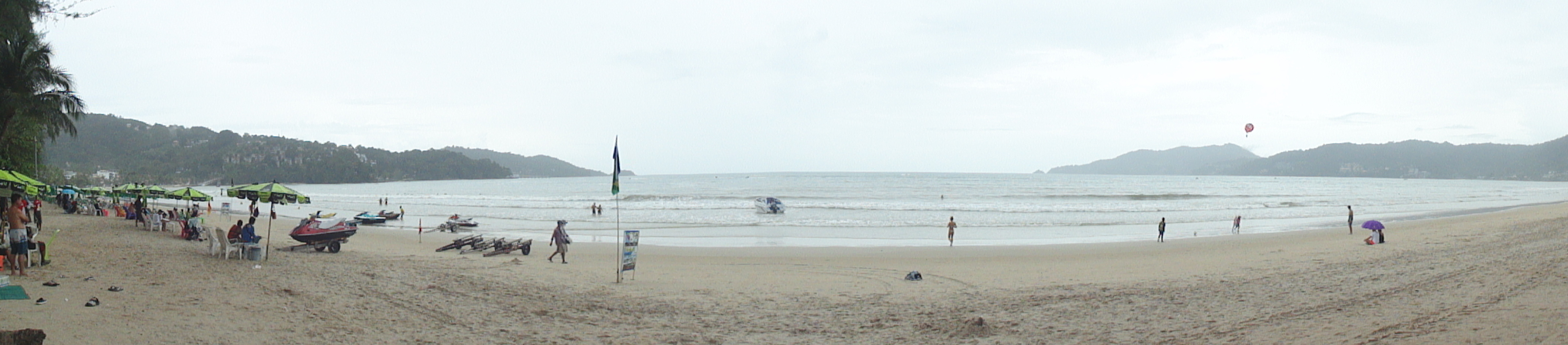
Patong Beach.

== Gallery ==
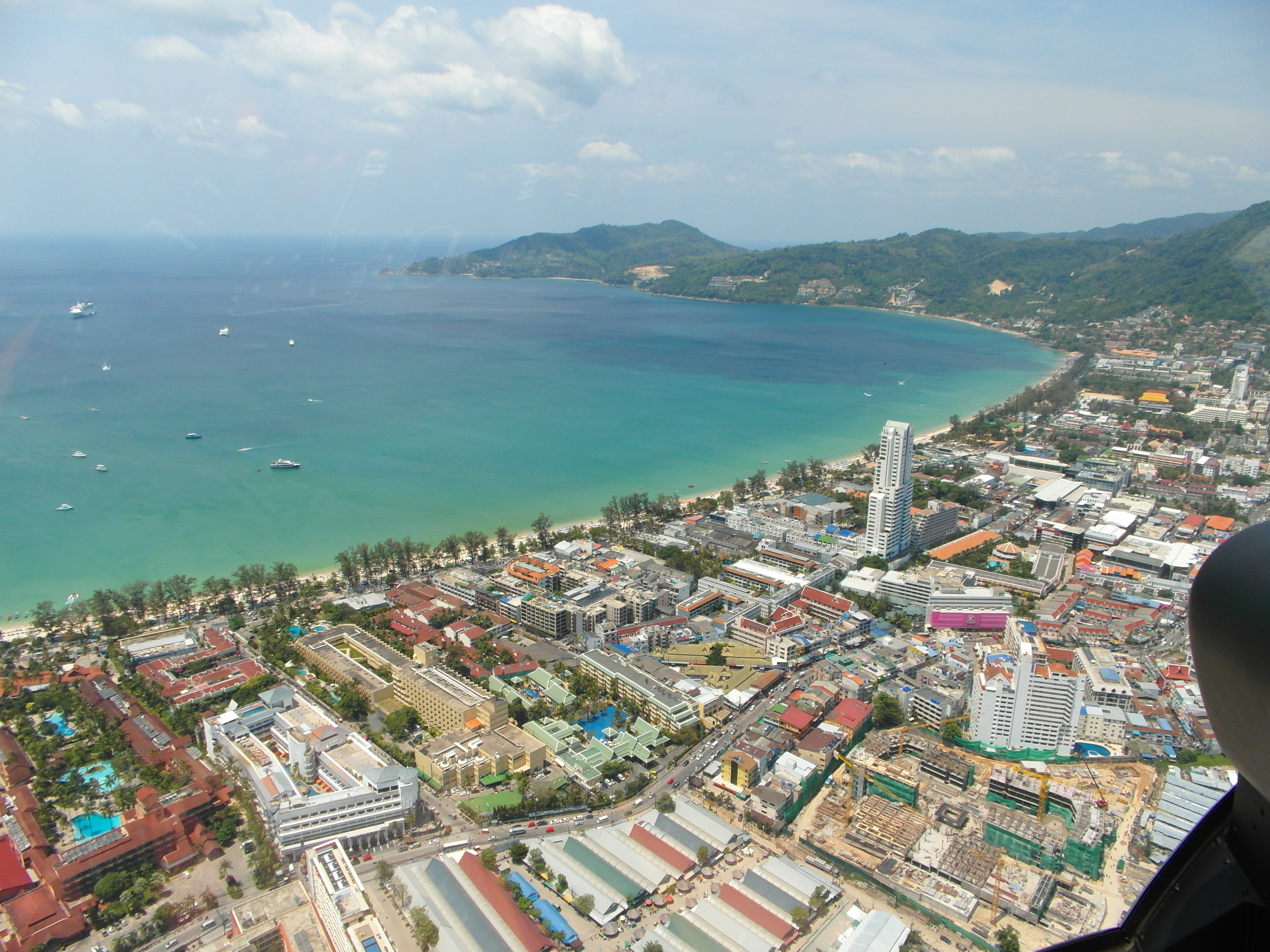
Aerial view of Patong

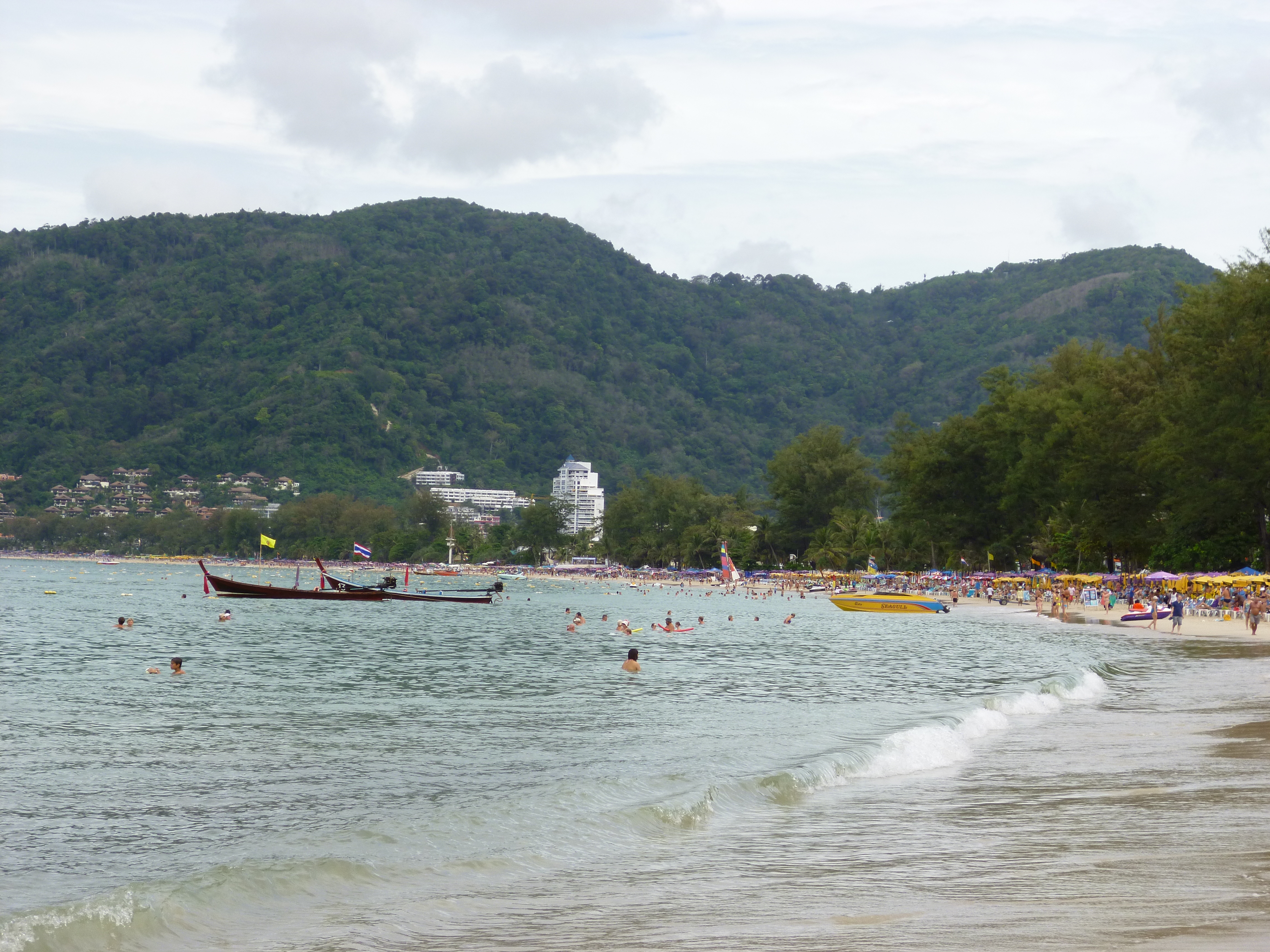
Patong Beach

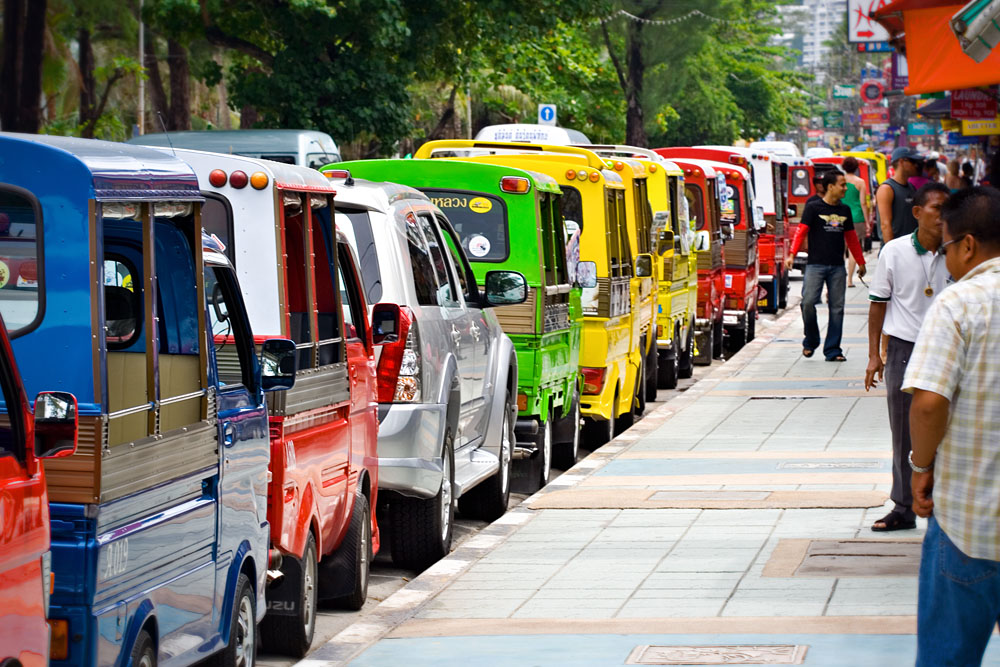
Songthaews, Thawiwong Rd, Patong Beach

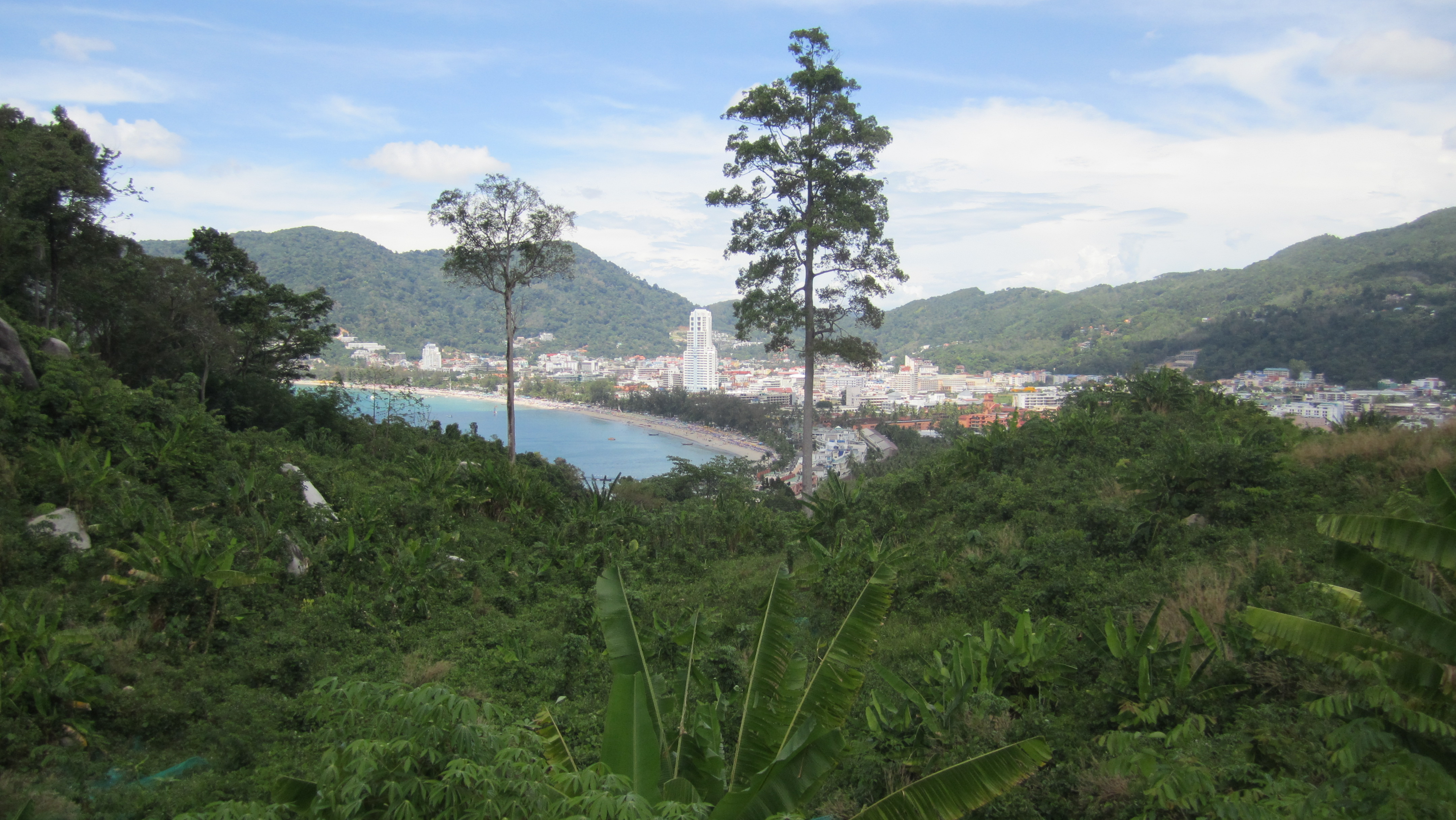
Patong Beach from Thawiwong

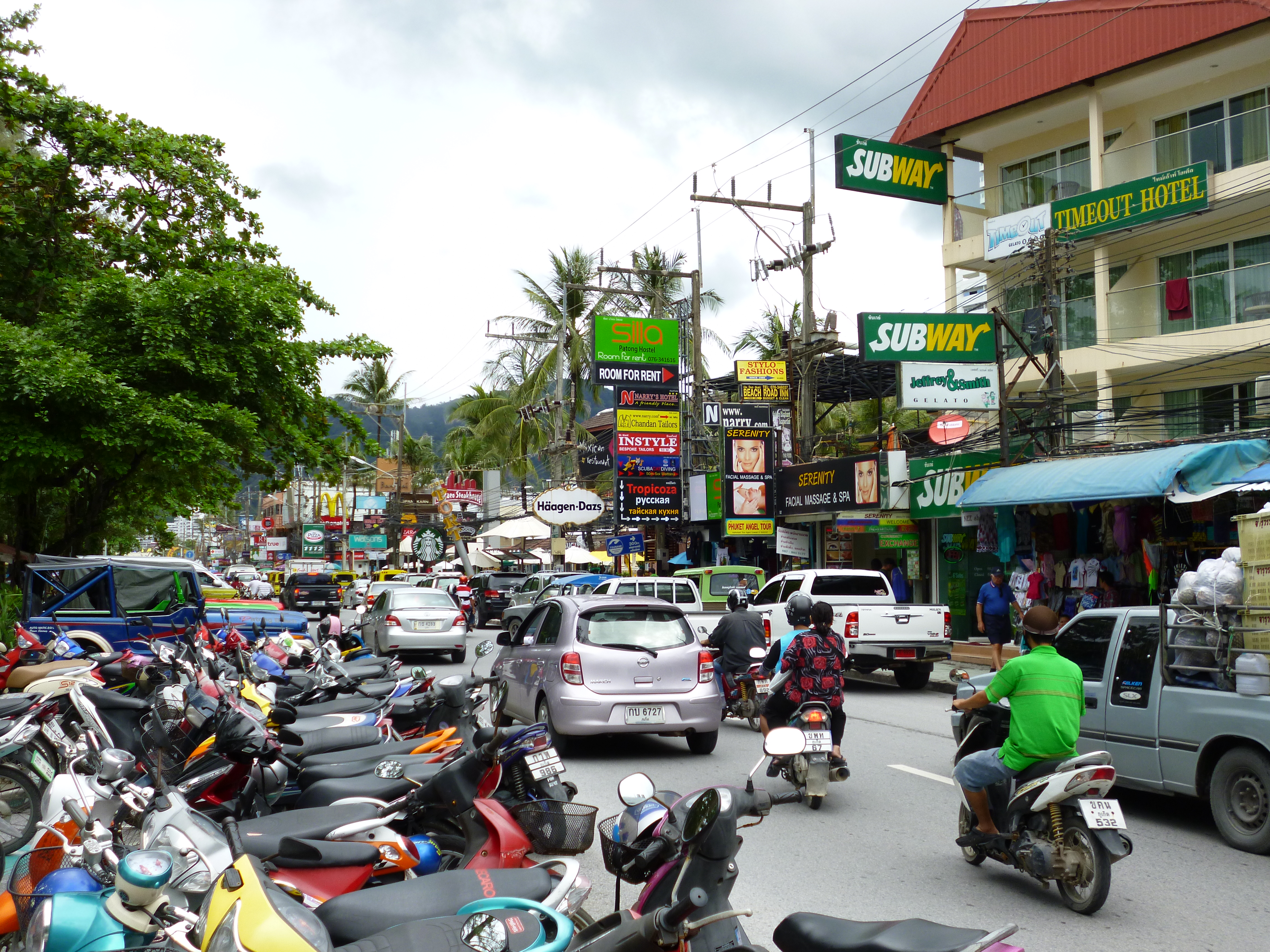
Traffic in Patong's streets

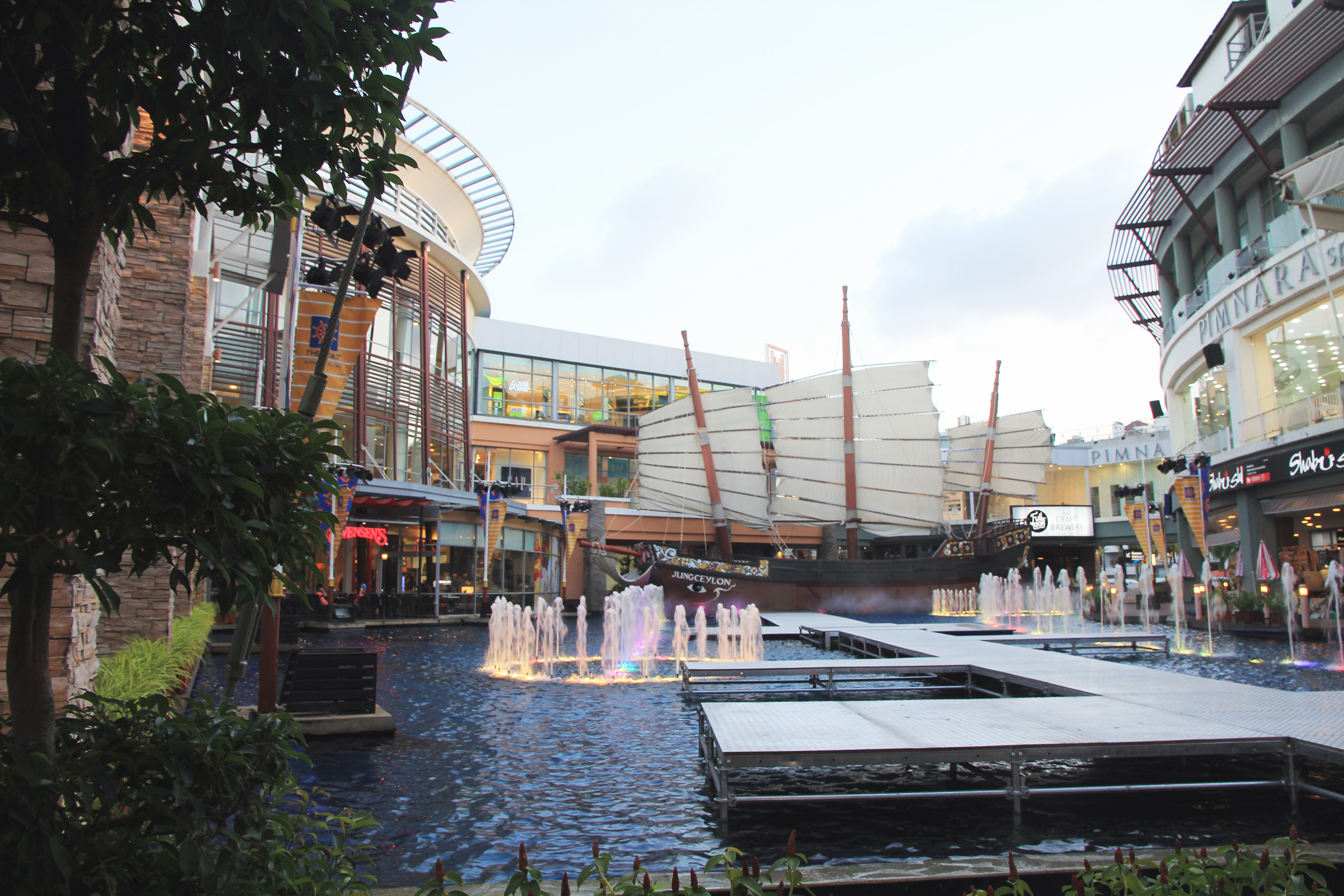
Jungceylon Shopping Mall

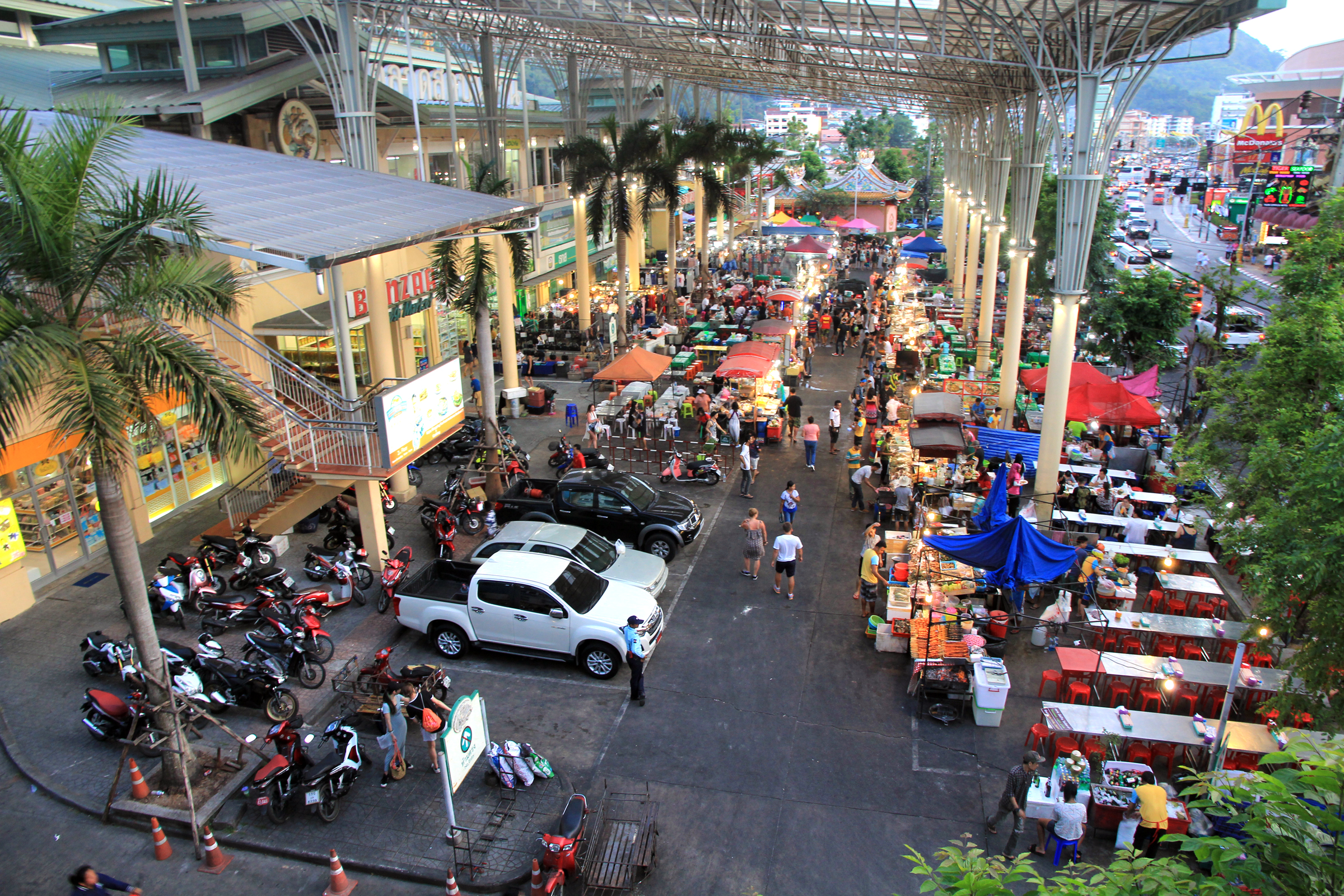
Banzan Night Market
