= Margi Scharff =

American artist

Margi Scharff (born February 11, 1955, Memphis, Tennessee - d. July 2, 2007, Tiburon, California) was an American artist. Among her better known pieces were The Night Room, Pillar of Warmth and A Series of Miscellaneous Connections. Scharff was given to using found objects in her art.

== Death ==
Scharff died of ovarian cancer, aged 52, in 2007.

== Exhibitions ==
- Cross Current and Intersection: L.A. Artcore (Los Angeles, California; 2003)
- Transmigrations (a travelling exhibition): Ann Bryant Gallery, East London (Durban, South Africa; 2003), the Olievenhuis Art Museum (Bloemfontein, South Africa; 2003) and the Pretoria Museum of Art (Arcadia Park, South Africa; 2002)
- Cross Tracks: The Blue Door (Los Angeles; 2001)
- Salon Show: Ruth Bachofner Gallery (Santa Monica; 2001)
- The Drawing Show (works From the Road in Mexico): Ellen Kim Murphy Gallery (Santa Monica, California; 1999–2000)
- Tijuana en Tarjetas: Galeria de la Ciudad (Tijuana, 1999)
- Vision sin Fronteras (Bajo la Falda installation and community project): Casa de la Cultura (Tijuana, 1998)
- Bajo El Mismo Sol: Collaboration with 12 artists living in Tijuana and Los Angeles; the project, coordinated by Luis Ituarte, took place in both cities and was supported by the Cultural Affairs Department in L.A. and Casa de la Cultura in Tijuana, Mexico and Los Angeles; 1997
- L.A. Current: The Female Perspective at UCLA's Hammer Art Rental and Sales Gallery (Los Angeles; 1996)
- One Vision: Space (Los Angeles; 1995)
- Downtown Lives (Pillar of Warmth installation and community outreach project): Downtown Arts Development Association (Los Angeles; 1994)
- International Group Show: Rachelle Lozzi Gallery (Los Angeles; 1994)
- The Last Glow (Reverse Polarity): Museum of Neon Art (Los Angeles, California; 1992)
- Modern Mountain Concert (Rib Cage set design and sculpture for Collage Ensemble): Chi Chi-Bu (Saitama, Japan; 1991)
- Eleven Los Angeles Artists (Inverse Reaction): 801 North Brand Gallery (Glendale; 1991)
- L.A. Place Projects (Structures from a Mobile Culture): Chapman Market (Los Angeles; 1991)
- Totems and Towers (Twilight Walk): Museum of Neon Art (Los Angeles; 1990)
- Eleven Artists (Everyday Objects and Circular Remains): Angel's Gate Cultural Center (San Pedro; 1990)
- Multiples (Gray Windows): Angel's Gate Cultural Center (San Pedro, California; 1989)
- Art L.A. 88: Thinking Eye Gallery, Los Angeles Convention Center (Los Angeles, California; 1988)
- Cutting Edge (Special Exhibit with Bent Wall for Art Expo): Los Angeles Convention Center (Los Angeles; 1988)
- Kodomo Micro Operas (Portals set design and sculpture for Collage Ensemble): Japan American Theatre (Los Angeles; 1988)
- Three Southern California Artists (Standing Portals): 801 North Brand (Glendale, California; 1988)
- L.A. + 250 (The Night Ramp): S.I.T.E. (Los Angeles, 1988)
- ART L.A. 87 (Thinking Eye Gallery): Los Angeles Convention Center (Los Angeles; 1987)
- Power and Taboo (Self Portrait in the Dark): Roberts Art Gallery (Santa Monica, California; 1987)
- Neon New Mexico: New Mexico Fine Arts Gallery (Albuquerque; 1987)
- Minimalist Impulse: Thinking Eye Gallery (Los Angeles; 1987)
- Reflections (The Night Slot): Museum of Neon Art (Los Angeles; 1986)
- Through Darkness to Light: The Women's Building (Los Angeles, California; 1985)
- Many Voices, Many Visions: El Camino College Art Gallery (Torrance; 1985)
- Contained Energies (2 person show at the Joslyn Center for the Arts; Torrance, California; 1984)
- California Women Artists: Corporate Center(Sacramento, California; 1984)
- Point of Reference: A.S.A. Gallery (Albuquerque, New Mexico; 1983)
- Process at Large: A.S.A. Gallery
- Armory Show: Santa Fe Armory for the Arts (Santa Fe, New Mexico; 1980)
