= Urairat Soimee =

Thai activist

- Urairat Soimee in Thailand several months before her death
- Born: 1968–1971; Lom Sak District, Thailand
- Died: 31 May 2006; Thailand
- Known for: Victim of human trafficking in Japan

Urairat Soimee (อุไรรัตน์ สร้อยมี) (1968, 1970, or 1971 – 31 May 2006) was a Thai activist and a victim of human trafficking in Japan.

Soimee was from Phetchabun's Lom Sak district in Thailand and had lived in Yokkaichi, Mie Prefecture, Japan, where she was forced into prostitution. She was incarcerated for several years in a Japanese prison until she was released in September 2005 due to the development of a terminal form of ovarian cancer. She was allowed to return to her hometown in Thailand to spend her final days with her family. Upon her return, Soimee filed a civil lawsuit against her traffickers in Thailand, reported to be the first suit of its kind in the country. However, she died in May 2006 before the case was adjudicated. Her adoptive mother said that she would continue her case in court.

== Background ==
Urairat Soimee was born in the Lom Sak district of Phetchabun, Thailand. She had three children and a husband, who became disabled due to a car accident. Like many women in her village, she was poor and had little formal education. She went by the nickname "Bua", which means "lotus flower" in Thai. She was recruited to work in Japan by a wealthy neighbor, Patama Kosaka, an alleged childhood friend of Soimee's mother. Kosaka claimed she was married to a Japanese man and that she owned a Thai restaurant in Japan where she wanted Soimee to work as a waitress. Soimee had no radio or television and little formal education, and therefore was not aware of the many cases in which women from Thailand were tricked or coerced into prostitution abroad.

== Forced prostitution in Japan ==
Soimee arrived in Japan in 2000 and was transported to Yokkaichi by a Thai woman named Dao and her husband, where she was told that she would have to work as a prostitute. When she protested, she was told that if she did not comply, she would be sold to a brothel on an island and thrown into the sea if she tried to escape. Soimee was told that she could leave after paying off her debt within five months. During this time, she was locked in the apartment with other Thai sex slaves, and taken out by Dao and her husband to hotel rooms to service customers, ranging from three to six a day. Soimee was forced to service customers even when menstruating, and after having contracted a painful sexually transmitted disease.

However, at the end of five months, Dao refused to release her, saying that she had been sold to another yakuza gang and that her debt had increased. It was at that point that Soimee reportedly contacted another Thai sex slave, Pranee, and a Thai friend, Boon, to help her escape.

== Escape and incarceration ==
The circumstances surrounding Dao's death and Urairat's escape are disputed. In an interview with the Bangkok Post, Soimee claimed that Boon, her friend, came to the apartment and helped her escape, and that Boon eventually killed Dao to prevent her from going to the yakuza. However, the Kyodo news service reported that Japanese prosecutors accused Soimee of robbery and murder by smashing Dao's head with a bottle.

Despite pleas from human rights organizations, Boon was sentenced to 10 years in prison for his role in the murder, and Soimee was sentenced for seven years. While in prison, Soimee was diagnosed with advanced ovarian cancer and released from custody to spend her remaining days with her family in Thailand.

== Court battle and final days ==
Patama and her parents, the three traffickers who deceived Soimee and Pranee into coming to Japan, were sentenced to 13 years imprisonment in criminal court. Soimee filed a 4.6 million baht civil lawsuit against the three, reported to be the first of its kind in Thailand. Her case was supported by The National Human Rights Committee (NHRC) and Fight Against Child Exploitation (FACE). However, she died in May 2006 before her case was adjudicated.

Her adoptive mother, Lamyai Kaewkerd, vowed to continue her battle in court. Upon her return to Thailand, Soimee became a strong voice against human trafficking, leading a campaign that urged other victims to step forward. She earned an award from Thailand's Social Development and Human Security Ministry in March 2006 to celebrate International Women's Day for her work in fighting human trafficking.

== See also ==
- List of kidnappings
- List of solved missing person cases (2000s)
