= Joli =

Joli is a surname. Notable people with the surname include:

- Antonio Joli (1700–1777), Italian painter
- France Joli (born 1963), Canadian singer
- Guillaume Joli (born 1985), French handball player

== See also ==
- Joli OS, an operating system developed by the company Jolicloud
- Jolie (disambiguation)
