= Jolie Christine Rickman =

American feminist and activist (1970–2005)

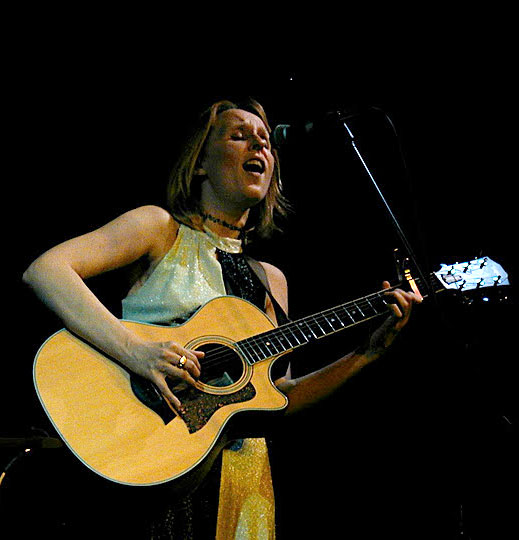
Jolie Rickman

Jolie Christine Rickman (July 9, 1970 – January 19, 2005) was an American feminist, humanitarian, social activist, and musician. She released three full-length recordings independently and was renowned for performing political songs condemning homophobia and racism.

== Background ==
Born in Los Angeles, California, she suffered juvenile onset macular degeneration and was pronounced legally blind by the time she was eleven years old. In 1988, she graduated with honors from Richards High School in Oak Lawn. Four years later, she graduated summa cum laude with a Political Science degree from University of Illinois at Urbana-Champaign (UIUC). Rickman spent her third year of undergraduate studies at the University of New South Wales, where she returned after graduation, for an academic internship.

Throughout her childhood, Rickman sang and wrote song lyrics, participating in school then civic musical theatre productions. It was while she was in Australia that she first learned to play the guitar, which opened her path towards musical activism through songwriting.

== Activism ==
During her stint at UIUC, Rickman took part in many politically progressive efforts, including the movement that launched the university YMCA’s Alternative Spring Break program, which, to this day, continues to connect young people with important nation-wide social justice issues. She later earned a graduate degree from the department of Peace Studies at Syracuse University. As a result of an internship with The King Center in Atlanta, Rickman worked with Coretta Scott King and cited the experience as her primary source of inspiration to perform music.

In 2001, she became Chapter Coordinator for CISPES in New York City. During her tenure, she initiated a Spanish Camp for Activists, an alternative Fourth of July weekend immersion in language and Latin American issues, and the People’s Referendum on Free Trade. The latter was responsible for recruiting members of the community into the struggle for economic fairness and equity.

== Death and Legacy ==
Rickman was diagnosed with ovarian cancer in 2004 and spent much of that year at her Brooklyn, New York home or in treatment at Memorial Sloan Kettering Hospital, where she died in January 2005, at age 34. In her memory, Democracy Now, Pacifica Radio, a nationally syndicated radio and television programme played an excerpt of "Romero" off the 1999 CD Sing It Down, a musical rendition of a homily from Archbishop Óscar Romero, given the day before he was assassinated. The CD, with fellow singer-songwriter Colleen Kattau — was part of a collaborative, multi-media educational project created by Rickman, Kattau, Bill Mazza (Jolie's long-time partner), and others, to demand the closing of the US Army's School of the Americas.

Since her death, many of Rickman's songs continue to be performed and recorded by other artists. Notable recordings include "La La La" by Pamela Means on "The Jazz Project" (2006), "Woman Nation" by Colleen Kattau on "Inhabited Woman (2007), "Romero" by Charlie King and Karen Brandow, on "Higher Ground" (2008), and "Out of Air" by Ember Swift on "11:11" (2012).

== Discography ==
- "Smattering" (1998)
- "Sublime Detonation" (1998)
- "Sing It Down" (1999)
- "Suffer To Be Beautiful" (2000)
