= Sol Republic =

American audio manufacturer

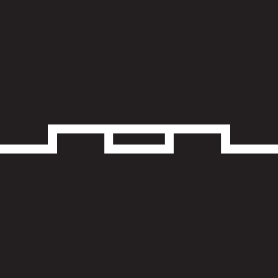
- Type: Privately held corporation
- Industry: Audio
- Founded: 2010
- Founder: Scott Hix; Seth Combs; Kevin Lee
- Headquarters: Commerce Township, Michigan, United States
- Number of locations: 3
- Area served: International
- Key people: Scott Hix; Seth Combs; Kevin Lee (CEO)
- Products: Headphones (In-ear and wireless); Bluetooth speakers; Audio accessories
- Owner: Kevin Lee
- Number of employees: 100
- Parent: HMDX audio
- Website: solrepublic.com

Sol Republic, Inc. (stylized in all caps, often subtitled Soundtrack Of Life) was an American privately held audio manufacturer based in Michigan. Founded in 2010 by Scott Hix, Seth Combs, and Kevin Lee, it was sold to HoMedics in late 2015 or early 2016.

Some of Sol Republic's best-selling products included the Tracks on-ear headphones, whose couplets are interchangeable with the included headband.

== History ==
The company was founded in 2010 by Scott Hix, Seth Combs, and Kevin Lee. Lee had worked at Beats Audio, while Hix had been an executive with InFocus. Lee's father, Noel Lee, founded video and audio cable company Monster. The name is an acronym for "soundtrack of life". By December 2011, the company had 33 employees split between headquarters in Wilsonville, Oregon, and San Francisco, California. In July 2011, the company received $5.2 million in investment funding, followed by $22 million in July 2012. Sol Republic introduced its DECK portable speaker in August 2013 in partnership with Motorola Mobility; the system was designed to work with the Motorola Moto X. At that time the company had grown to 85 employees.

The company raised another $27 million in March 2014, by which time it was employing 100 people and had its products in 26,000 retail stores. The funding came from Riverwood Capital and Greenoaks Capital Management, and was expected to be used to expand into international markets as well as new product development. Sol Republic's main distribution channels at that time were through Apple, RadioShack, and Best Buy.

In 2014, the President of Sol Republic, Scott Hix, gave up his duties to co-founder and CEO Kevin Lee. Hix still owns a major portion of the company and is still considered a co-founder. Hix's business partner Brad Gleeson also left the company in January 2014.

On October 20, 2015, Sol Republic partnered with Indiegogo in an attempt to crowd fund their newest invention; the Relay Sport Wireless

During December 2015, the official website was shut down temporarily for redesign of the entire structure. They were also purchased by HMDX audio, and had their headquarters relocated to the same location as HMDX. In this merger, many of the styles of Tracks were discontinued, including their college and musician styles, as well as some of their Bluetooth devices, such as the Deck speaker and Tracks Air headphones. They also switched from using custom made and sized boxes for shipping to using generic packaging.

Around October 2021, Sol Republic shut down their website and discontinued their products. This coincided with the shift away from 2010s-era "fashion" audio brands towards Bluetooth headphones from brands including Apple, Sony and Bose. Existing products remained supported during their respective warranty period.

== Products ==
Sol Republic manufacturers a variety of audio products, such as headphones, portable speakers, and ear buds. To help in marketing the products, the company has partnered with musicians and DJs such as Calvin Harris, Deadmau5 and Steve Aoki. Artist Jesse Hernandez was hired by the company to design a line of headphones in 2015.

=== Headphones ===
- Tracks (All models are in Regular, HD, Master, Air (Discontinued), or Collegiate editions)
- Shadow Wireless
- Relays (Sport and Sport Wireless models)
- Jax
- Amps (discontinued)
- Amps Air

=== Speakers ===
- Punk (discontinued)
- Deck (discontinued) (Both Regular and Ultra models)
