= OC Weekly =

Alternative weekly paper distributed in Orange County and Long Beach, California

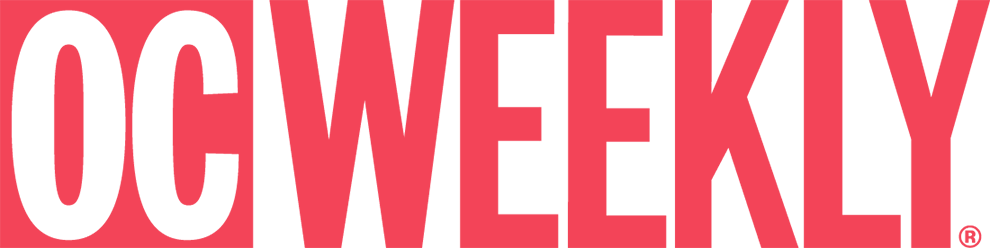

- Type: Alternative weekly
- Owner: Duncan McIntosh Co
- Publisher: Cynthia Rebolledo
- Editor: Matt Coker
- Founded: September 1995; 30 years ago
- Ceased publication: November 27, 2019
- Headquarters: 18475 Bandilier Cir. Fountain Valley, California 92708; USA
- Circulation: 45,000 (2016)
- OCLC number: 37629323
- Website: ocweekly.com

OC Weekly was a free alternative weekly paper distributed in Orange County and Long Beach, California. It was founded in September 1995 by Will Swaim, who acted as editor and publisher until 2007.

The paper was distributed at coffee shops, bookstores, clothing stores, convenience stores, and street boxes. OC Weekly printed art and entertainment listings for both Orange and Los Angeles counties. As of 2016, it had a total circulation of 45,000 papers with an estimated readership of 225,000.

On November 27, 2019, Duncan McIntosh Co. announced the immediate shutdown of the publication.

== Content ==
The weekly highlighted content that critiqued local politics, personalities and culture and has been described as "what some people might politely call an edgy brand of journalism." Popular features included: the syndicated column "¡Ask a Mexican!", in which publisher Gustavo Arellano responded to reader questions about Latino stereotypes in an amusing politically incorrect manner; an award-winning news blog called Navel Gazing; a food blog called "Stick a Fork in It"; and the award-winning investigative work of R. Scott Moxley, Nick Schou and Matt Coker.

== Ownership ==
Duncan McIntosh Co., Fountain Valley, California, owned the publication along with Sea Magazine, BoatingWorld, The Log, and Editor & Publisher. The previous owner was Voice Media Group and was a sister publication of the LA Weekly and The Village Voice. In January 2015, Voice Media Group offered the OC Weekly for sale. Duncan McIntosh purchased the paper in 2016. On November 27, 2019, Duncan McIntosh Co. announced the immediate shutdown of the publication.

== Awards and reputation ==
For his newspaper work, the publisher Gustavo Arellano received a 2014 Distinguished Journalist Award from the Greater Los Angeles chapter of the Society of Professional Journalists and the 2008 Spirit Award from the California Latino Legislative Caucus as well as awards from the Association of Alternative Newsweeklies, the Los Angeles Press Club and the National Hispanic Media Coalition.

The OC Weekly's articles frequently targeted conservative politicians and hypocrisies within the local establishment. Exposés have led to felony indictments against two consecutive Huntington Beach mayors.
