= Monster Mini Golf =

American chain of entertainment centers

- Company type: Privately held company
- Industry: Entertainment
- Founded: 2004; 22 years ago
- Headquarters: Providence, Rhode Island, U.S.
- Number of locations: 31 (29 in U.S. and 2 in Canada)
- Area served: North America
- Owners: Christina Vitagliano co-founder/co-CEO; Patrick Vitagliano co-founder/co-CEO
- Website: monsterminigolf.com

Monster Mini Golf is a franchised chain of entertainment centers. The locations feature an indoor, 18-hole glow-in-the-dark mini golf course, video and redemption arcade games, three-dimensional animatronic props, an in-house radio station, party rooms for hosting birthday parties and other special events, as well as laser-tag, laser-maze, and bowling in some of the newer, larger facilities. The parent company, Monster Entertainment, LLC is headquartered in Providence, Rhode Island, United States, and Las Vegas. As of January 2023 the chain has 31 locations, either open or under construction, across the United States and Canada.

== History ==
Christina and Patrick Vitagliano opened the first Monster Mini Golf in an 8,000-square-foot (740 m^{2}) space in an old textile mill in the small community of Danielson, Connecticut, on Memorial Day weekend in 2004. By 2005, they had made the decision to franchise, and were legal to offer franchises by November of that year.

In 2012, the company opened Kiss by Monster Mini Golf in Las Vegas, Nevada, a facility themed around hard rock band Kiss. Currently located in the Rio All Suite Hotel and Casino, this location features the typical Monster Mini Golf fare (but heavily Kiss-themed), a rock and roll themed wedding chapel called "The Love It Loud Wedding Chapel", the world's largest Kiss gift shop, and a museum featuring memorabilia from the band's storied career on display. It also hosts regular appearances by Kiss band members, both past and present.

In 2021, Christina and Patrick Vitagliano retired and sold the Monster Mini Golf franchise to its top franchisees.

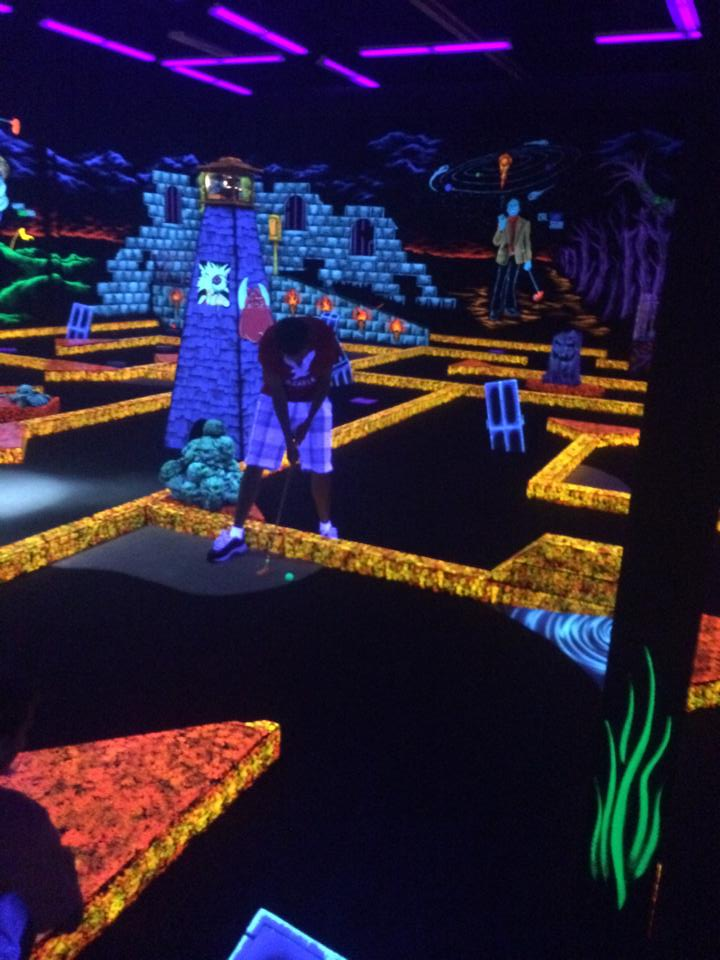

== Locations ==
All locations incorporate glow-in-the-dark settings with fluorescent golf balls and monsters. The only consistent features in each franchise are the "Enter at Your Own Risk" sign that hangs above the cast-iron gated entrance to the "cemetery," a hole featuring a mole hill with the cup inside the mole hill, a hole with a tricky path (hole in the middle of a hill followed by an animatronic organ player at the top of the hill), and the trademark clown statue that escorts customers out after the last hole (a reference to the movie Happy Gilmore). Locations typically include two party rooms and an arcade with games such as glow-in-the-dark air hockey tables, custom-made glow-in-the-dark pool tables and arcade games as well as ticket redemption games such as glow Skee Ball.

Each location is customized to reflect the local culture.

Monster Mini Golf has grown organically since inception, and as of January 2023, has grown to 31 locations in the US and Canada.

== Franchise ==
Monster Mini Golf had been nominated by franchisees for Top New Franchise on Bizzia.com in 2007. Customers have also shown their interest, based on the company’s uniqueness and creativity behind the indoor mini golf concept. Monster Mini Golf sites average 9,000 to 12,000 square feet (1,100 m^{2}) and are typically located in strip malls, stand-alone buildings or other commercial spaces. 100% of all franchises are currently owner operated. As of 2017, there are currently 28 franchised locations in the US and Canada.

== Monster Cable vs. Monster Mini Golf ==
Monster Cable brought suit against Monster Mini Golf in 2006. Noel Lee, The CEO of Monster Cable, claimed that the public would be confused by the similarity of the names Monster Cable and Monster Mini Golf. After mediation and royalty suggestions that the owners deemed to be unfair; Monster Mini Golf launched a grassroots campaign against Monster Cable on the Internet, which managed to garner nationwide attention and support. After receiving hundreds of complaints from the public, Monster Cable dropped the lawsuit and agreed to pay up to $200,000 of Monster Mini Golf's legal fees.
