= Jesse Hernandez (disambiguation) =

Jesse Hernandez may refer to:

- Jesse Hernandez, Mexican-American wrestler
- Jesse Hernandez (artist), American graphic designer and tattoo artist
- Jesse Hernandez (cheerleader), American NFL cheerleader
