= EPPY Awards =

The EPPY Awards
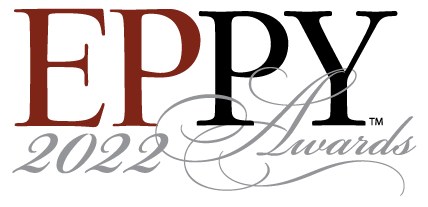
- Awarded for: The EPPY™ Awards honor the best in digital news publishing across more than 45 diverse categories, including excellence in college/university digital journalism.
- Location: Interactive Media Conference & Trade Show (1999–2010); Online (2011–present)
- Country: United States of America
- Presented by: Editor & Publisher
- Formerly called: Best Online Newspaper Services Competition
- First award: 1997
- Website: www.eppyawards.com

The EPPY Awards honor excellence in digital publishing, and are presented by Editor & Publisher magazine. Designed in 1996 to honor newspaper companies that did an "outstanding job in creating online services," the awards were originally given in partnership between Mediaweek and Editor & Publisher and named the Best Online Newspaper Services Competition, and presented at the end of the Interactive Newspaper Conference.

In 1998 the awards were renamed the EPPY Awards. and in 2003 the awards were expanded to recognize websites associated with other media outlets, as well as newspapers. Today the EPPY Awards honor the best in digital news publishing across more than 45 diverse categories, including excellence in college/university digital journalism.

From 2003 to 2009 Mediaweek co-sponsored the (renamed) Interactive Media Conference & Trade Show, and both the awards and conference were moved from February to May. Beginning in 2011, the EPPY Awards moved online and is now totally run and owned by Editor & Publisher Magazine.

The latest 2022 EPPY Awards winners included Best Daily Newspaper Website (1 million or more unique visitors), The Boston Globe for BostonGlobe.com. Best Black Newspaper Website (fewer than 1 million unique visitors), Defender Network for DefenderNetwork.com. Best Sports News Website (1 million or more unique visitors), ESPN Digital Media. Best Business/Finance Website (1 million or more unique visitors), CNBC for CNBC.com and Best Collaborative Investigative/ Enterprise Reporting (1 million or more unique visitors), Bloomberg Businessweek and Bloomberg Green for "The Methane Menace."

== Award categories ==
As of 2022 the EPPY Awards are awarded across 47 diverse media-related categories, with two tiers based on readership size (over or under 1 million unique monthly visitors).

=== Website categories ===
- Best daily newspaper website
- Best weekly or non-daily newspaper website
- Best Black newspaper website
- Best Hispanic newspaper website
- Best Asian newspaper website
- Best magazine website
- Best sports news website
- Best sports news website
- Best online-only news website
- Best local TV news website
- Best local radio news website
- Best business/finance website
- Best entertainment / cultural news website
- Best mobile news app

=== Content categories ===
- Best investigative/enterprise feature
- Best collaborative investigative/enterprise reporting
- Best news or event feature
- Best business reporting
- Best business/finance blog
- Best news/political blog
- Best use of data/infographics
- Best use of social media/crowd sourcing
- Best innovation project on a website
- Best community service project/reporting
- Best news or event feature video
- Best investigative/enterprise video
- Best investigative/enterprise video
- Best sports video
- Best podcast
- Best photojournalism on a website
- Best editorial/political cartoon
- Best incorporation of sponsored/branded content
- Best overall website design
- Best home page design
- Best redesign/relaunch
- Best website navigation design
- Best cause marketing/corporate social responsibility campaign
- Best promotional/marketing campaign

=== College categories ===
- Best college/university campus website
- Best college/university-produced community or Niche Website
- Best collaborative college/university & professional website
- Best news story on a college/university website
- Best feature story on a college/university website
- Best video on a college/university website
- Best photojournalism on a college/university website
- Best college/university investigative/documentary
- Best college/university sports section/website

== Dates and locations ==
Year	Dates	Conference	Venue/Location	Source
1996	unavailable	7th Interactive Newspapers Conference	unavailable	
1997	February 14, 1997	8th Interactive Newspapers Conference	Houston Hyatt, Houston, Texas	
1998	February 6, 1998	9th Interactive Newspapers Conference	Sheraton Hotel & Towers, Seattle, Washington	
1999	Feb. 1999	10th Interactive Newspapers Conference	Hyatt Regency Atlanta, Atlanta, Georgia	
2000 winners	February 11, 2000	11th Interactive Newspapers Conference & Trade Show	New Orleans, Louisiana	
2001winners	February 22, 2001	12th Interactive Newspapers Conference & Trade Show	Dallas, Texas	
2002 winners	February 8, 2002	13th Interactive Newspapers Conference & Trade Show	San Jose Convention Center, San Jose, California	
2003 winners	May 9, 2003	14th Interactive Media Conference & Trade Show	Paradise Point Resort, San Diego, California	
2004 winners	May 12, 2004	15th Interactive Media Conference & Trade Show	Hyatt Regency Atlanta, Atlanta, Georgia	
2005 winners	June 9, 2005	16th Interactive Media Conference & Trade Show	New Orleans, Louisiana	
2006 winners	May 22, 2006	17th Interactive Media Conference & Trade Show	New Orleans, Louisiana	
2007 winners	May 27, 2007	18th Interactive Media Conference & Trade Show	Miami, Florida	
2008 winners	May 18, 2008	19th Interactive Media Conference & Trade Show	Rio All-Suite Hotel and Casino, Las Vegas, Nevada	
2009 winners	May 7, 2009	20th Interactive Media Conference & Trade Show	Las Vegas, Nevada	
2010 winners	June 17, 2010	21st Interactive Media Conference & Trade Show	Las Vegas, Nevada	
2011 winners	November 30, 2011		online - Editorandpublisher.com	
2012 winners	October 30, 2012		online - Editorandpublisher.com	
2013 winners	October 30, 2013		online - Editorandpublisher.com	
2014 winners	October 29, 2014		online - Editorandpublisher.com	
2015 winners	October 29, 2015		online - Editorandpublisher.com	
2016 winners	October 27, 2016		online - Editorandpublisher.com	
2017 winners	October 25, 2017		online - Editorandpublisher.com	
2018 winners	October 24, 2018		online - Editorandpublisher.com	
2019 winners	October 23, 2019		online - Editorandpublisher.com	
2020 winners	October 22, 2020		online - Editorandpublisher.com	
2021 winners	December 13, 2021		online - Editorandpublisher.com	
2022 winners	December 21, 2022		online - Editorandpublisher.com	
