= Editor & Publisher =

American monthly trade news magazine

- Cover from September 2023
- Editor-in-Chief: Robin Blinder
- Former editors: Greg Mitchell (2002–2009)
- Categories: Trade magazines
- Frequency: Monthly
- Publisher: Mike Blinder
- First issue: 1901; 125 years ago
- Company: Curated Experiences Group
- Country: United States
- Based in: Hendersonville, Tennessee
- Language: English
- Website: editorandpublisher.com
- ISSN: 0013-094X (print); 1943-7234 (web)
- OCLC: 123532423

Editor & Publisher (E&P) is an American monthly trade news magazine covering the news media industry. Published since 1901, Editor & Publisher is the self-described "bible of the newspaper industry," with offices in Hendersonville, TN.

== Overview ==
Editor & Publisher (E&P) covers all aspects of the news media industry. The magazine's original tagline was "The newsmagazine of the fourth estate." As of 2022, E&P's tagline is "The Authoritative Voice of #NewsMedia Since 1884".

Today E&P still publishes a monthly print magazine that is mailed to over 5,000 news publishing executives and distributed at yearly news media events.

E&P presents the annual EPpy Awards for excellence in digital publishing.

== History ==
A 1914 cover from the original magazine (Archive.org)

Editor & Publisher evolved from several publications, the oldest of which — the weekly The Journalist, the first successful American trade newspaper covering journalism — had been founded in 1884. The Editor & Publisher: A Journal for Newspaper Makers itself was founded in 1901, and in 1907 it merged with The Journalist. E&P later acquired the trade journal Newspaperdom (established 1892), and in 1927 it merged with the trade paper The Fourth Estate.

E&P published the long-awaited King–Crane Commission Report (officially called the 1919 Inter-Allied Commission on Mandates in Turkey) in its December 2, 1922 edition.

From 1990 to 2010, Editor and Publisher produced the Interactive Newspapers Conference (which changed its name to the Interactive Media Conference & Trade Show in the year 2000). MediaWeek joined as a co-sponsor in 2003. The annual conference was held in various locations around the United States, frequently in New Orleans and Las Vegas. Since 1996, E&P has presented the EPPY Awards, an award for media-affiliated websites. The EPPYS were presented at the Interactive Media Conference until 2011 when they went fully online.

For many years the company published the Editor & Publisher International Yearbook. It still publishes the annual Editor & Publisher DataBook and this data is also available on the website.

Editor & Publisher was acquired in 1999 by the Nielsen Company. Nielsen shut down E&P at the end of 2010, but the magazine was revived when the Duncan McIntosh Company purchased it from Nielsen.

In September 2019 Editor & Publisher was purchased by Curated Experiences Group owned by Mike Blinder, experienced media consultant.

In October 2020, Editor & Publisher partnered with Poynter Institute and America's Newspapers to launch the Media Job Board, a journalism and media job listings website.

In January 2021, the magazine donated their digitized "back issues" to Internet Archive where now hundreds of issues of E&P published since 1901 are available for free.

== See also ==
- Press Gazette – covering British newspaper industry
