= Rio Las Vegas =

Casino resort in Las Vegas, Nevada

Rio
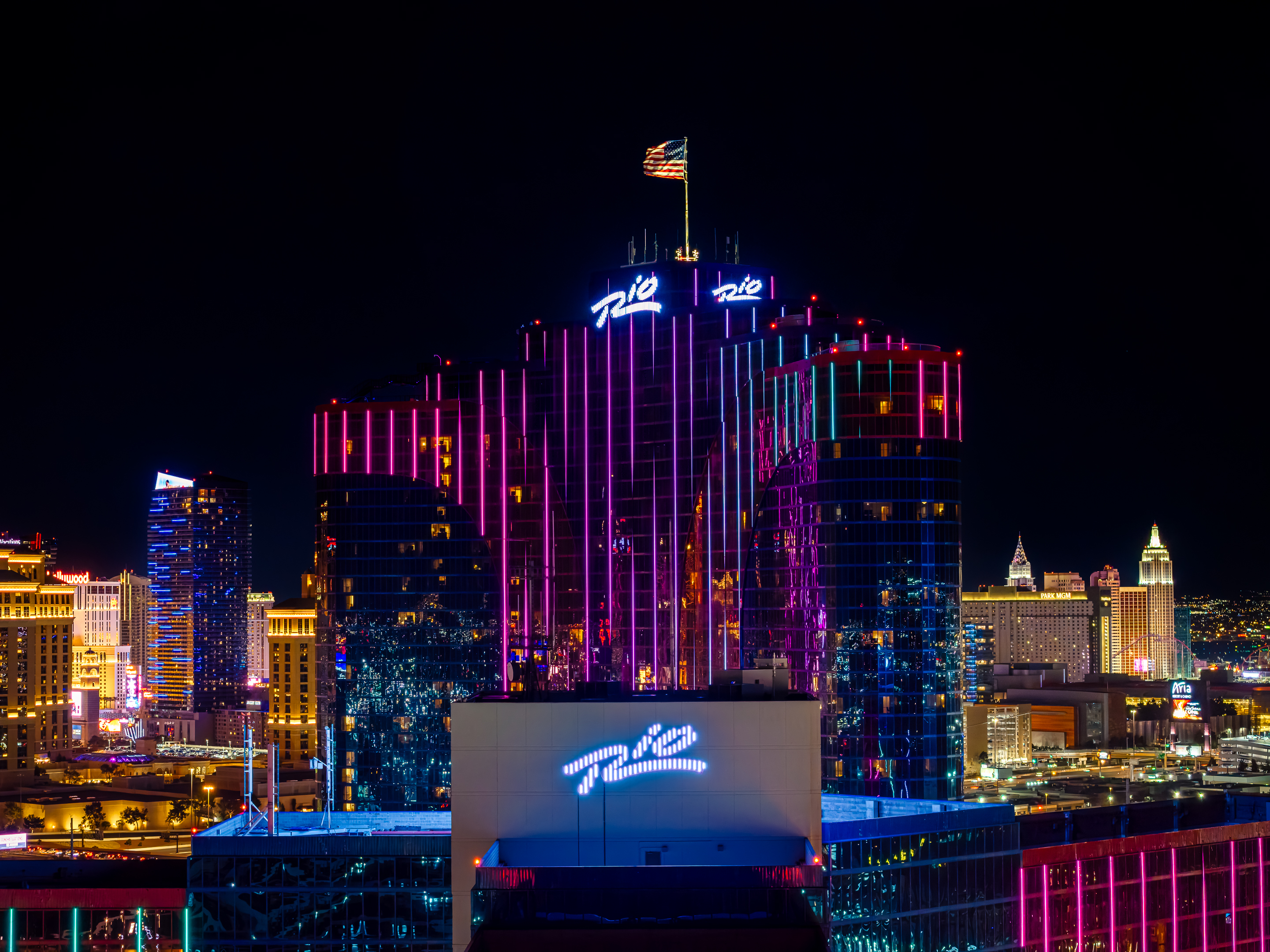
- The Rio's Masquerade Tower at night, April 2025
- Interactive map of Rio
- Location: 3700 West Flamingo Road Paradise, Nevada 89103; 36°7′3″N 115°11′17″W
- Opened: January 15, 1990; 36 years ago
- Theme: Brazilian culture
- No. of rooms: 2,520
- Gaming space: 117,330 sq ft (10,900 m^{2})
- Permanent shows: Penn & Teller; Chippendales (2002–2024); The Empire Strips Back; Tony n' Tina's Wedding (2002–2009); WOW - The Vegas Spectacular
- Signature attractions: KISS by Monster Mini Golf
- Notable restaurants: Canteen Food Hall; Guy Fieri's El Burro Borracho; Hash House a go go KJ Dim Sum; Smashburger; VooDoo
- Casino type: Land-based
- Owner: Kennedy Lewis Investment Management (majority owner); Dreamscape Companies LLC (minority owner)
- Architect: Marnell Corrao Associates
- Renovated in: 1993–1999, 2004–06, 2023-
- Website: riolasvegas.com

The Rio is a hotel and casino near the Las Vegas Strip in Paradise, Nevada, United States. It is owned and operated by Dreamscape Companies LLC. It includes a 117,330 sq ft (10,900 m^{2}) casino and 2,520 suites. It features a Brazilian theme based on Rio Carnival.

The Rio opened on January 15, 1990, with a 44,000 sq ft (4,100 m^{2}) casino and 424 suites. It was the first all-suite hotel in the Las Vegas Valley. It was owned by Anthony Marnell and built by Marnell Corrao Associates. The property struggled during its first two years because of its off-Strip location, but it would eventually thrive. The Rio's success prompted a number of hotel expansions in the 1990s. The hotel includes the three-wing Ipanema Tower, which stands at 20 stories. A 1997 renovation added Masquerade Village, a two-story retail and restaurant complex which also featured the Masquerade Show in the Sky. The 41-story Masquerade Tower was added as well.

In 1999, Marnell sold the Rio to Harrah's Entertainment for $766 million. The property suffered financially after the sale, in part because of new competition. It would lose its popularity in the years to follow, as Harrah's would eventually turn its focus to other Las Vegas properties that it owned. From 2005 to 2021, the Rio was the host site for the World Series of Poker. Portions of the hotel were closed in 2007 for county inspections, after it was discovered that renovations had been done a few years earlier without permitting. Numerous repairs had to be made after the inspections revealed flaws and fire safety hazards.

Harrah's was renamed Caesars Entertainment in 2010. The Rio was sold to Dreamscape owner and New York investor Eric Birnbaum in 2019, at a cost of $516 million. Caesars continued to operate the casino through a lease agreement extending to October 2023, after which Dreamscape took over. A two-phase renovation began in August 2023, and will update the entire property. Marnell was hired as architect for the renovation project, due to his prior experience with the resort.

The Rio has hosted numerous entertainers, including Danny Gans and Prince. Magicians Penn & Teller have entertained at the resort since 2001, and the male revue Chippendales ran from 2002 to 2024.

== History ==
=== Marnell ownership (1990–99) ===
The Rio was originally owned by Anthony Marnell, the chairman of MarCor. The company purchased the vacant property in 1988, at a cost of $11 million. At the end of the year, it announced plans to build the Rio, which would be Las Vegas' first all-suite hotel-casino. MarCor broke ground on the $80 million project on February 9, 1989. The groundbreaking ceremony included a 15-foot by 30-foot sand sculpture replica of the 21-story hotel. The resort was designed and built by Marnell Corrao Associates.

The Rio opened on January 15, 1990. It featured a Brazilian theme based on Rio Carnival, and Brazilian musician Sérgio Mendes performed at the resort a few weeks later. The property included a 44,000 sq ft (4,100 m^{2}) casino, with 900 slot machines and 42 table games. It also had 424 suites, five restaurants, five bars, and a pool with a waterfall. It employed 1,500 workers, including cocktail waitresses known as Ipanema Girls. The resort's target demographic would consist primarily of local residents and motorists from southern California. Resort officials believed that the property's location, just west of Interstate 15 and the Las Vegas Strip, would be appealing to tourists.

The Rio was the first casino opened by MarCor, which had largely focused on business parks and shopping centers. Marnell took over operations at the Rio 10 months after its opening, as he had found the early results dissatisfying. The resort struggled during its first two years, due to its location away from the Strip. By 1992, MarCor had sold all of its other properties to focus solely on the Rio.

==== Expansions ====
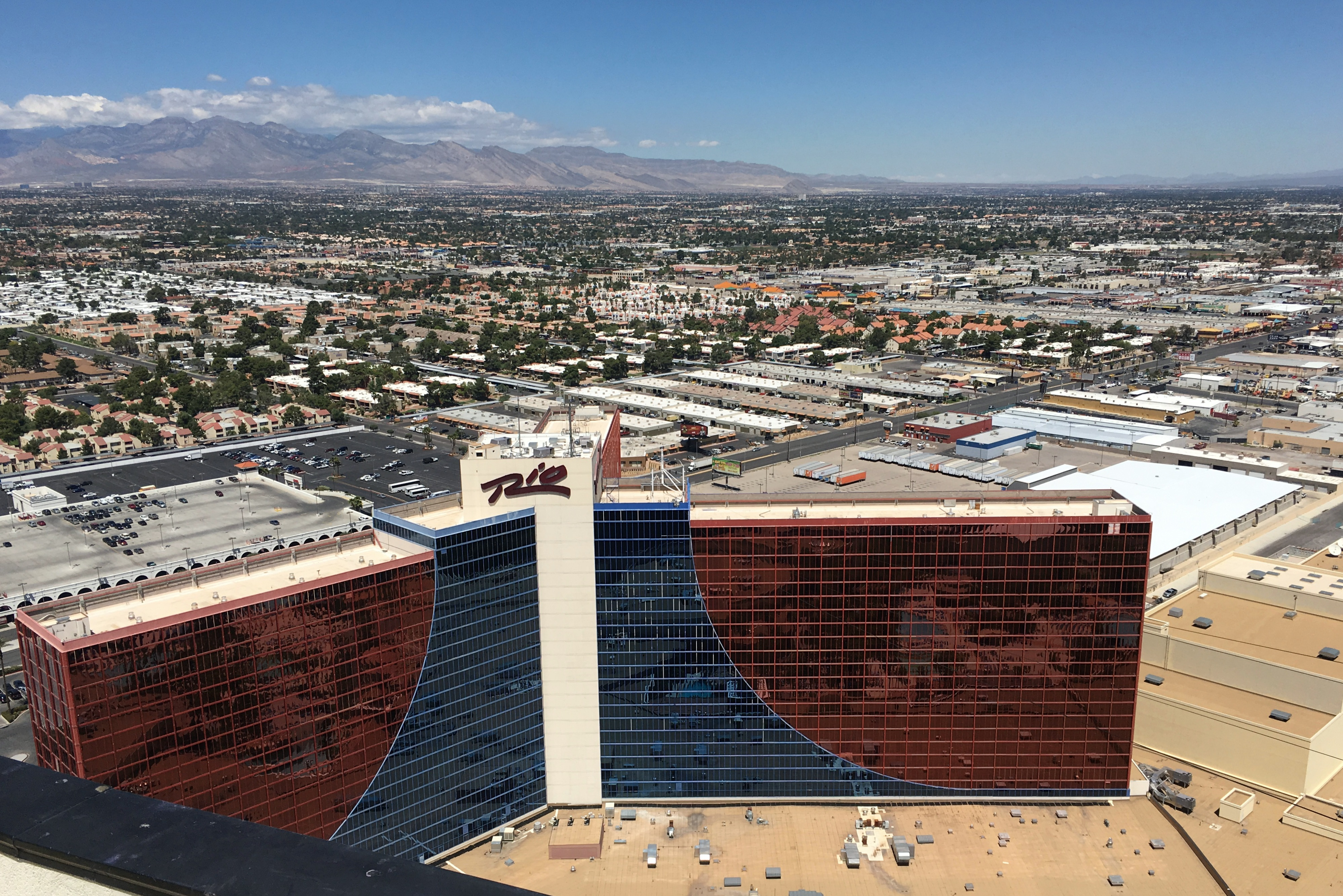
Ipanema Tower

The hotel was soon successful, prompting a 437-unit addition, which broke ground on January 4, 1993. A $25 million expansion was announced later that year which would include more casino space. The new hotel tower opened during Labor Day weekend, bringing the room count to 861. The casino expansion opened at the end of 1993. A few months later, the resort announced a $75 million addition which would further expand the casino, and would increase the hotel with 549 rooms, for a total of 1,410. A dance and supper club, known as Club Rio, was opened in 1994, and was subsequently turned into a showroom.

The Rio had a $250,000 laser system for nighttime displays. The system had to be adjusted in 1994, to avoid temporarily blinding commercial pilots. In 1995, Zagat named the Rio number one in the categories of Best Overall, Best Dining, Best Rooms and Best Service. A $20 million expansion began that year, adding 144 suites, more meeting room space, and a new health club and salon facility. The original hotel structure and its extensions make up the Ipanema Tower, which consists of three wings, built out in a "Y" shape.

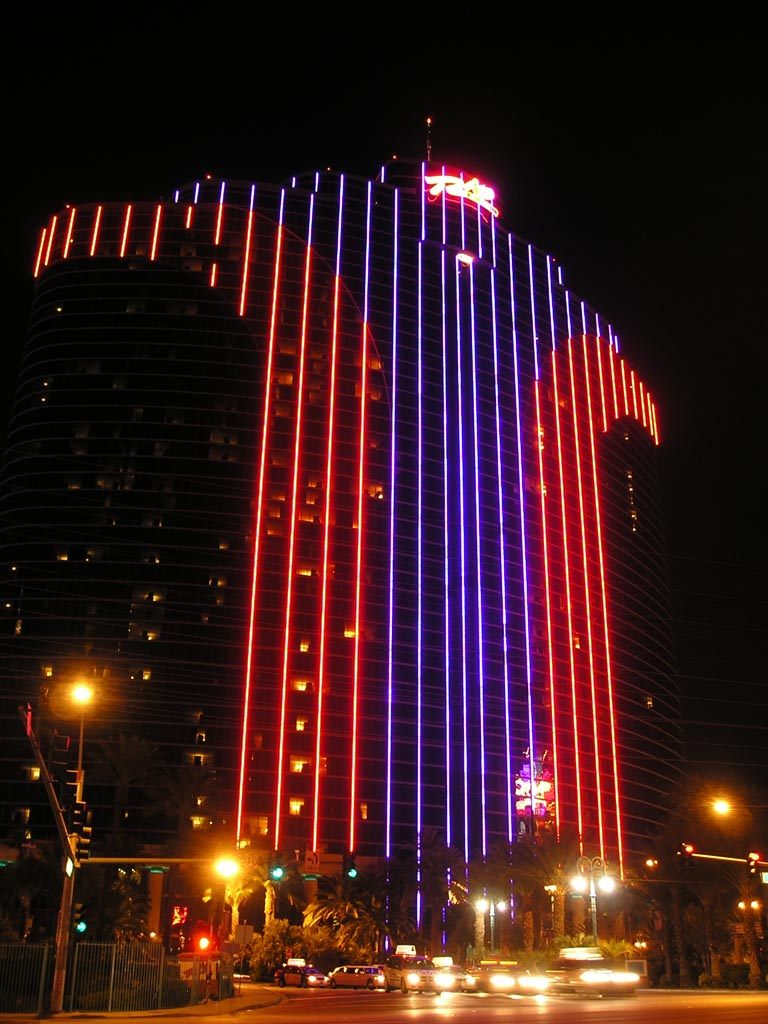
Masquerade Tower

A $187 million expansion was underway in 1996, including six new restaurants and the addition of a 41-story tower with 1,000 rooms. The new tower brought the room count to 2,563, ranking the Rio among the world's largest hotels. The tower rises 383 feet.

In February 1997, the Rio unveiled its indoor Masquerade Village, a Mardi Gras-themed attraction at the base of the new tower that included retail, restaurants, and a wine cellar. The retail space consisted of 21 stores, spread across two floors and occupying a total of 32,000 sq ft (3,000 m^{2}). At the time, Marnell held a 25-percent interest in the resort and was its largest shareholder.

Another expansion began at the end of 1997, adding more convention and retail space, and increasing the size of the resort's spa, among other areas. The project, expected for completion in 1999, would also add a valet parking garage, and the Palazzo Suites for high rollers. The nine suites are located in a separate building located on the Rio property.

The Rio was one of the fastest-growing resort properties in Las Vegas. Its clientele was split between locals and tourists, and the property began offering beach parties and targeting a younger clientele and international high rollers. In 1998, readers of Travel + Leisure named the Rio as the world's number one hotel value.

=== Harrah's/Caesars ownership (1999–2019) ===
In August 1998, Harrah's Entertainment (later Caesars Entertainment Corporation) agreed to purchase the Rio from Marnell. The sale was finalized five months later, at a cost of $766 million. Harrah's considered the Rio to be among its top resorts. Later in 1999, Harrah's and Rio began operating the short-lived National Airlines service. New villas were built for high rollers, and the casino's private baccarat area was redesigned. The resort also increased its convention center space from 15,000 sq ft (1,400 m^{2}) to 110,000 sq ft (10,000 m^{2}).

In 2000, the National Labor Relations Board filed a complaint against the Rio, suspecting it of firing or harassing employees who sought unionization with the Culinary Workers Union. Later that year, the union filed a lawsuit against the Rio, seeking to represent its 3,000 employees. The Rio was unionized in January 2001, after a majority of employees voiced their support.

Undeveloped acreage near the Rio was a significant reason for Harrah's purchase, and the company considered using the site for additional hotel rooms. However, profits were hurt in 2000 due to table game losses. The departure of entertainer Danny Gans was another factor for the property's poor performance, along with competition from new resorts, including the Bellagio, Mandalay Bay, the Venetian, Paris, and the Aladdin. The Rio laid off nearly 200 employees as a cost-saving measure.

The property saw financial improvement in 2001, and Harrah's announced that it was in the early stages of planning for a new hotel tower at the Rio. However, the property's revenue declined again later in the year, which Harrah's blamed on table game losses. The Rio's younger clientele had since moved on to newer resorts, and the property partnered with the men's magazine Maxim in an effort to recapture the demographic. Through the partnership, the Rio would be advertised in the magazine, and parties – known as Maxim Lounge – would be held at the Rio. Cash flow subsequently improved, and Harrah's submitted plans to the county in 2002, for a new hotel and casino on the undeveloped acreage. Marnell had previously planned to build another resort on the same property.

In December 2003, Harrah's announced a partnership with Voyager Entertainment to build what would have been the world's tallest observation wheel, rising 600 feet. It would be part of an $86 million complex that would include three floors of retail, restaurants, and a nightclub. The project would be built on the Rio parking lot's southeast side. Construction was scheduled to begin within three months, with the opening in July 2005. Another hotel tower was also a possibility, although there were no immediate plans to build one. Despite a lack of financing, Voyager stated that it would have no issues in raising the necessary funds. Negotiations between Voyager and Harrah's eventually derailed, and the project was canceled in April 2004.

In May 2004, the Rio began preliminary operations of a power plant which would ultimately provide 40 percent of the property's power. A month later, construction began on a $39 million expansion of the Rio Pavilion Convention Center. It was built north of the resort's existing facilities, and was opened in 2005.

The Rio became the host casino for the World Series of Poker in 2005, boosting the resort's popularity. The Rio's importance to Harrah's was diminished after the company purchased Caesars Entertainment in 2005, thereby acquiring several resorts on the Las Vegas Strip. In 2005, the Rio's cocktail servers were fitted with RFID tracking tags in their uniforms, allowing management to determine how long customers were waiting to be served.

==== Renovation project ====
Various hotel renovations took place from 2004 to 2006, in the Ipanema Tower. In October 2007, a number of hotel rooms in the tower were closed for county inspections, after a two-month investigation by the Las Vegas Review-Journal found that the remodeling had taken place without permits and inspections. The county had briefly looked into the renovation work, but quickly dismissed concerns about the lack of permits, until the news investigation prompted a reopening of the case. At one point prior to the case's reopening, a building inspection supervisor claimed to have examined 37 rooms throughout the tower, finding no major issues. It was later discovered that the supervisor had only been at the Rio for 38 minutes.

The renovations had occurred on floors 3 through 19, and there were concerns about whether the renovated floors were up to fire safety standards. The entire 19th floor was gutted, except for the walls of the central hallway. Harrah's initially dismissed concerns about the renovations, stating that they were cosmetic and did not require permits. Of the tower's 1,448 rooms, 12 were closed for inspections. Within a few days, the closure extended to 140 rooms across the 18th and 19th floors. Concrete slabs in between the two floors were lacking fire sealant following the renovations, and such repairs were eventually undertaken on 360 rooms in an entire wing of the Ipanema Tower that dated to the property's opening in 1990. Various other problems were discovered as well, including the unauthorized installation of ceiling lights and electrical outlets. Post-tension cables were also damaged in some rooms during the remodeling.

The county inspection expanded to other floors in December 2007, after additional fire safety hazards were found. These included unsealed holes which would allow the infiltration of smoke in the event of a fire. More than 1,000 rooms were inspected, and 50 were closed for a lengthy period of time. Harrah's received four criminal misdemeanor citations for the unauthorized renovations.

==== Later years ====
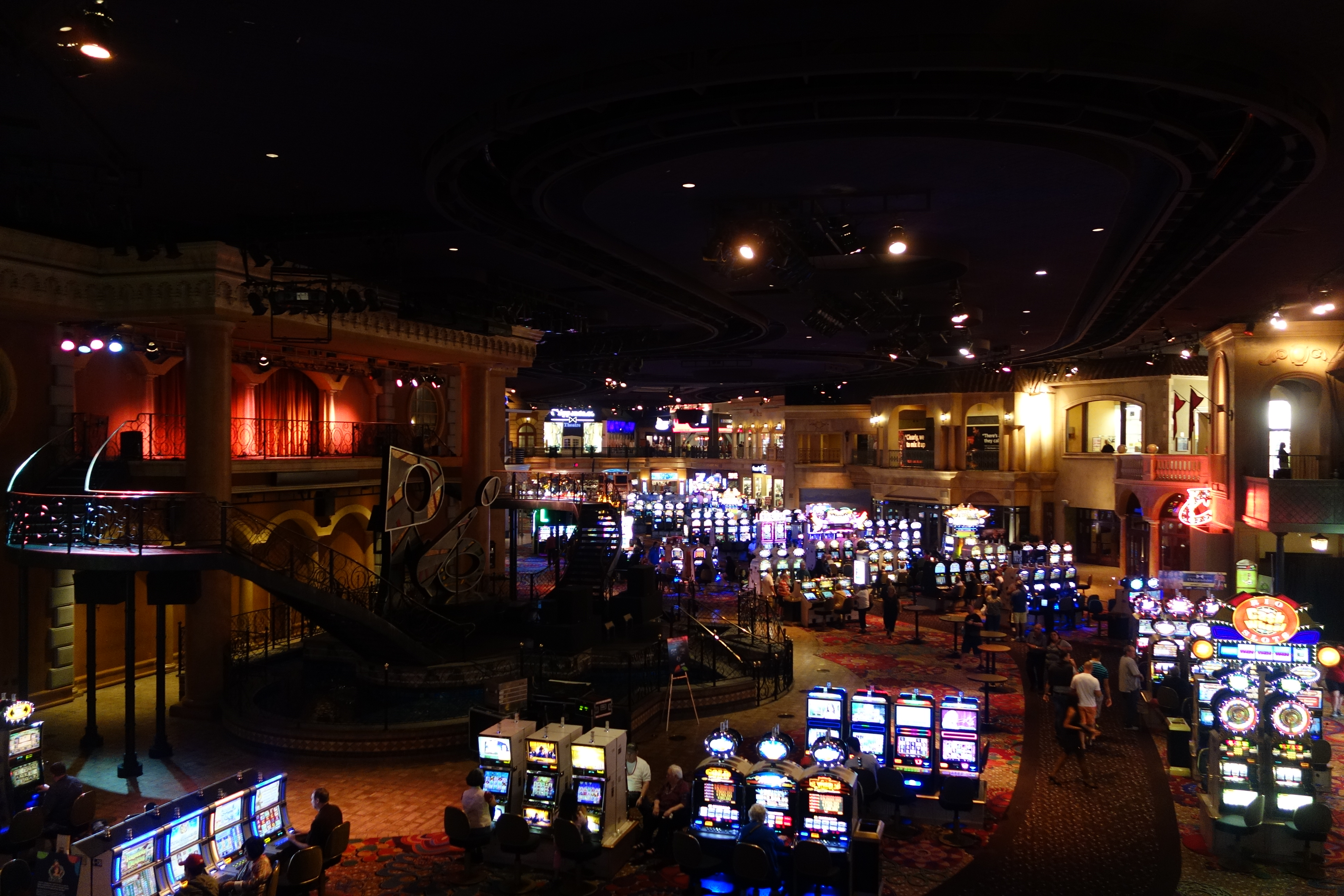
Overlooking the casino floor in 2013

Following the Great Recession, most of Harrah's cash flow went to its Strip properties, leaving the Rio to become neglected. At the end of 2008, the Rio launched an opt-in mobile marketing campaign, providing promotions to customers via text messages. Two years later, it began offering resident discounts in an effort to attract more locals.

As of 2010, Harrah's had considered several purchase offers for the Rio, including a $450 million proposal by Penn National Gaming. Out of Harrah's 10 local properties, 9 of them were on the Las Vegas Strip, with the Rio as the outlier. The Rio's off-Strip location made it difficult for Harrah's to market the resort to customers of its other properties. Furthermore, the Rio had lost the popularity it had under Marnell's ownership in the 1990s. The property had received numerous complaints relating to maintenance and service, which employees blamed on cost-cutting measures by Harrah's. However, an imminent sale did not occur, and the Rio remained under the same ownership for the next decade.

Harrah's was renamed Caesars Entertainment Corporation later in 2010. At the time, the Rio was valued at approximately $500 million. It included a 117,300 sq ft (10,900 m^{2}) casino with 1,100 slot machines and 90 table games, as well as 160,000 sq ft (15,000 m^{2}) of convention space.

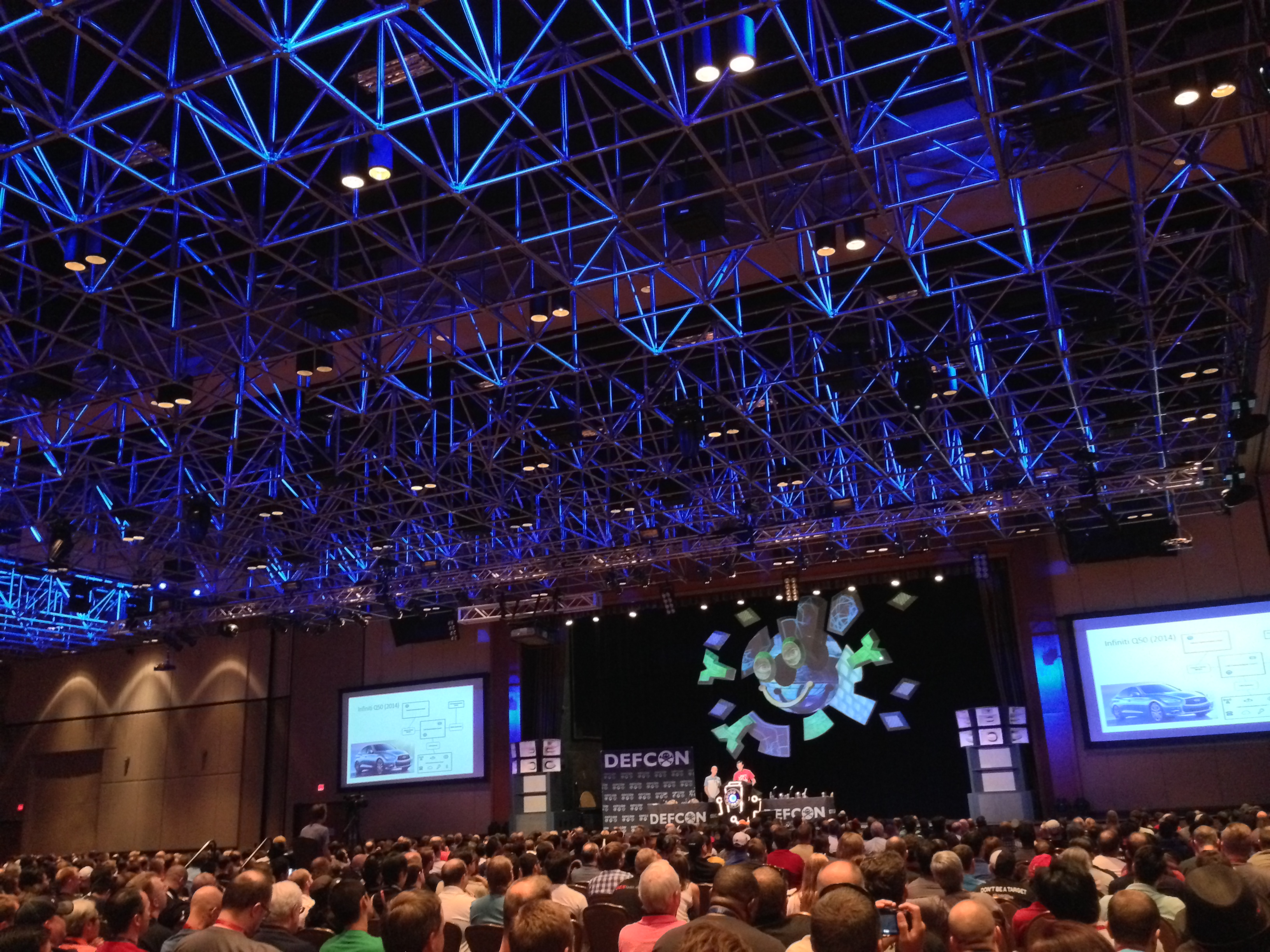
DEF CON 2014

The Rio stayed competitive in the 2010s thanks to the World Series of Poker, as well as Caesars' database of 55 million rewards club members. Superkarts USA (SKUSA) also held its SuperNationals kart racing event at the Rio each year, taking place on a temporary circuit set up in the resort's parking lot. The Rio has also hosted a Star Trek convention every year since 2011. In addition, it hosted the DEF CON hacker convention from 2011 to 2014.

A robbery occurred in 2011, with $33,200 in casino chips stolen. Two men were arrested in connection with the robbery, and a third was apprehended nine years later. In 2013, a norovirus outbreak occurred among 100 people staying at the Rio for a youth football tournament taking place in Las Vegas.

On the evening of December 28, 2016, water from a clogged sink overflowed into an electrical conduit, in a service area of the Masquerade Tower. It caused a fuse to blow, cutting out power for 400 rooms located on the 22nd floor and onward. The blown fuse had also sparked a small fire in a service elevator, which was put out by sprinklers. However, the next morning, leftover sprinkler water trickled down and shorted out a fuse in the backup generator, which cut out power for another 500 rooms. Guests had to be evacuated to other hotels. Six guests received minor injuries during the evacuation. Power to the lower portion of the tower was restored within a day, and full power was gradually restored over the course of a week.

In 2017, two guests contracted Legionnaires' disease during separate stays at the Rio hotel. The property's water systems were disinfected upon the discovery of Legionella bacteria. Additional cases of Legionnaires' disease were diagnosed among Rio guests later that year, in addition to 56 suspected cases of Pontiac fever, also caused by Legionella. One of the infected guests sued Caesars Entertainment over the outbreak.

As of 2019, Caesars had spent $600 million on renovations for various properties over the past five years, with the exception of the Rio, which now competed with older, low-budget resorts such as Circus Circus. Marnell, who was disappointed by the property's deterioration, speculated that it would need $300 million in renovations to be highly competitive once again.

=== Dreamscape ownership (2019–present) ===
In December 2019, Caesars sold the Rio for $516 million to New York-based real estate developer Eric Birnbaum. Under the deal, Caesars would continue to operate the Rio under lease for at least two years, paying $45 million a year in rent. The Rio is owned through Birnbaum's company, Dreamscape Companies LLC. His plans for a significant renovation were delayed due to the COVID-19 pandemic in Nevada, which resulted in the state-ordered closure of casinos in March 2020. The Rio partially reopened on December 22, 2020, but with hotel operations limited mostly to weekends. Full operations resumed four months later. It was the last Caesars property nationwide to reopen. Because of the pandemic, Caesars and Dreamscape extended their lease arrangement, allowing Caesars to continue operating the property for several years. Dreamscape took over operations on October 1, 2023.

In March 2021, Dreamscape announced a partnership with Hyatt, which would rebrand one of the hotel towers as a Hyatt Regency. The hotel was originally scheduled to open in 2023, with 1,501 rooms. The remaining rooms are also expected to be affiliated with Hyatt. The resort has 2,520 rooms, including the Palazzo Suites. Aside from the hotel portion, the property will maintain the Rio name and its theme.

Because of his prior experience with the property, Marnell was hired as architect for the renovations, which were originally expected to begin in 2022. The project was rescheduled, eventually beginning in August 2023. The Rio will remain open throughout the multi-year renovation, which will update the entire resort. The two-phase renovation project will cost $340 million, and is intended to restore the Rio's early popularity.

Renovations began with the Ipanema Tower, and continued with renovations to the restaurant space, the pool, and the exterior lighting. On the hotel's exterior, the original red and blue neon lighting was replaced with new LED displays that are capable of producing various colors. The LEDs were programmed by Chris Kuroda, the lighting director for the band Phish. The renovation project also added 400 new slot machines. The Hyatt partnership took effect on March 1, 2024.

Phase one of the Rio's multi-year, $340 million property-wide transformation was completed on September 30, 2024. Phase two was planned to include a full renovation and redesign of the 1,012 rooms in the Masquerade Tower and its associated public spaces. In January 2025, president and CEO Patrick Miller said the redevelopment was being considered and could begin later that year, although no construction schedule was announced. In August 2025, the Rio secured a $176.5 million retroactive C-PACE loan through Peachtree Group. The financing was intended to reimburse qualifying improvements that had already been completed at the property and help pay down existing debt, rather than to fund the upcoming Phase 2 renovation. In April 2026, Kennedy Lewis Investment Management acquired a majority ownership stake in the Rio, buying out former minority owner Bill McBeath and reducing Dreamscape Companies to a minority stakeholder. The Las Vegas Convention and Visitors Authority's May 2026 construction bulletin continued to classify Phase 2 as an announced and proposed project, describing the planned work as a renovation of the Masquerade Tower and public spaces, with both its construction cost and completion date listed as undetermined. As of November 2026, no publicly announced construction start date or revised completion schedule for Phase 2 had been identified.

==== Sports venue proposals ====
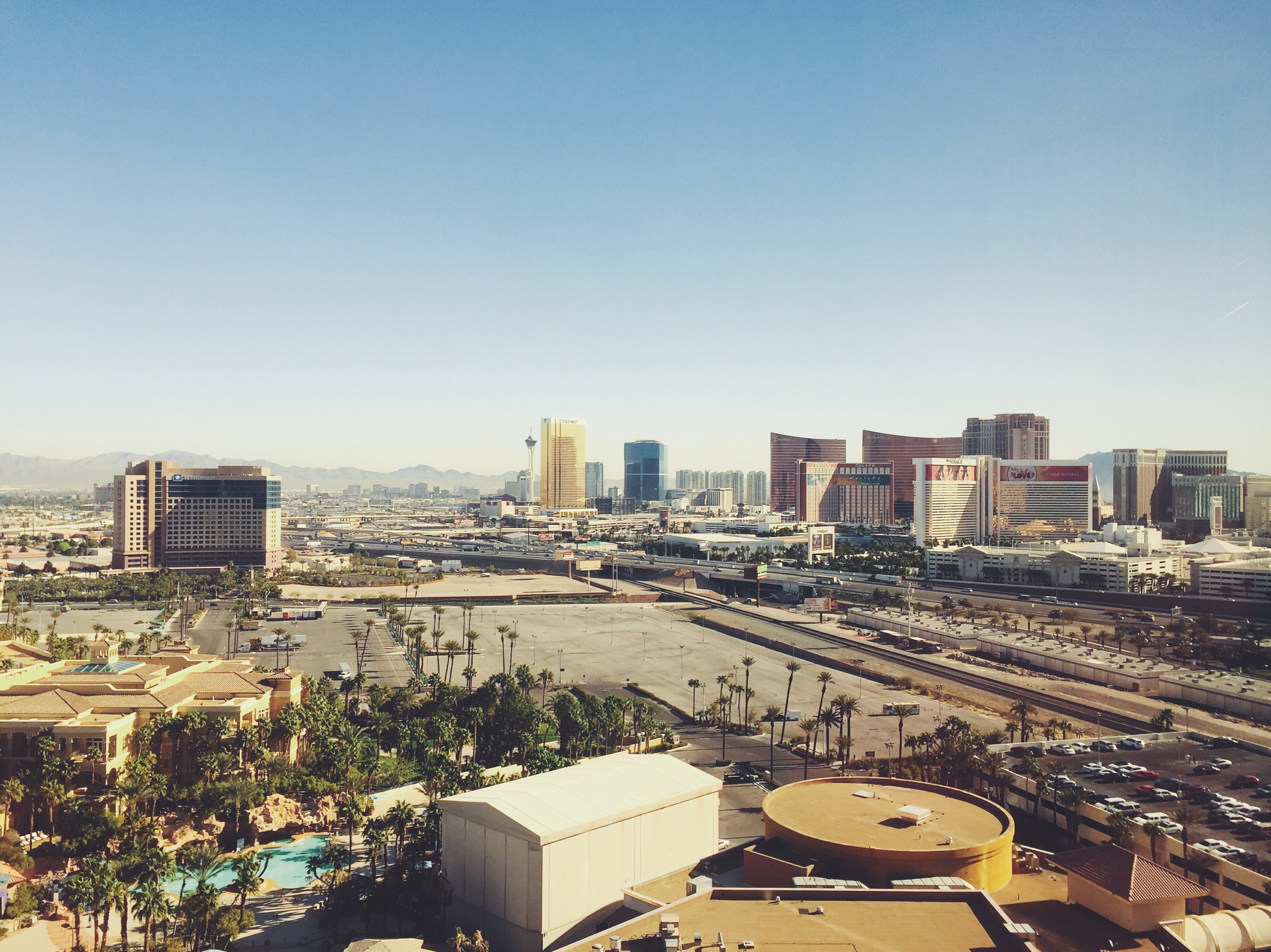
The Rio's northeastern parking lot, where a sports arena could be built

In 2023, Dreamscape offered to sell the Rio's northeastern parking lot for $1 to the MLB's Oakland Athletics franchise, which had announced that it would relocate to Las Vegas. The team turned down the offer, choosing to build its new stadium elsewhere. That year, Oak View Group proposed building an NBA arena south of the Strip, but reportedly began considering the Rio as an alternative site in 2024.

== Features ==
=== Restaurants ===
The Rio was particularly well known for its restaurants, five of which were listed in a top-40 list by Zagat in the 1990s. Six new restaurants were added in 1997. Among them was Napa, which was overseen by chef Jean-Louis Palladin. The top of the Masquerade Tower featured a restaurant and lounge known as VooDoo, which remains as of 2025. An Italian restaurant, Mama Marie's Cucina, was named after Rio founder Tony Marnell's mother. The resort also featured the new Seafood Village Buffet, a separate eatery from the Carnival World Buffet. As of 1999, the Rio's 15 restaurants served an average of 20,000 people each day. Its busiest eatery was the Carnival World Buffet, averaging 7,000 diners daily. The Rio hosted the annual James Beard Foundation benefit dinner for several years during the 1990s. The resort also hosted an annual Italian food festival.

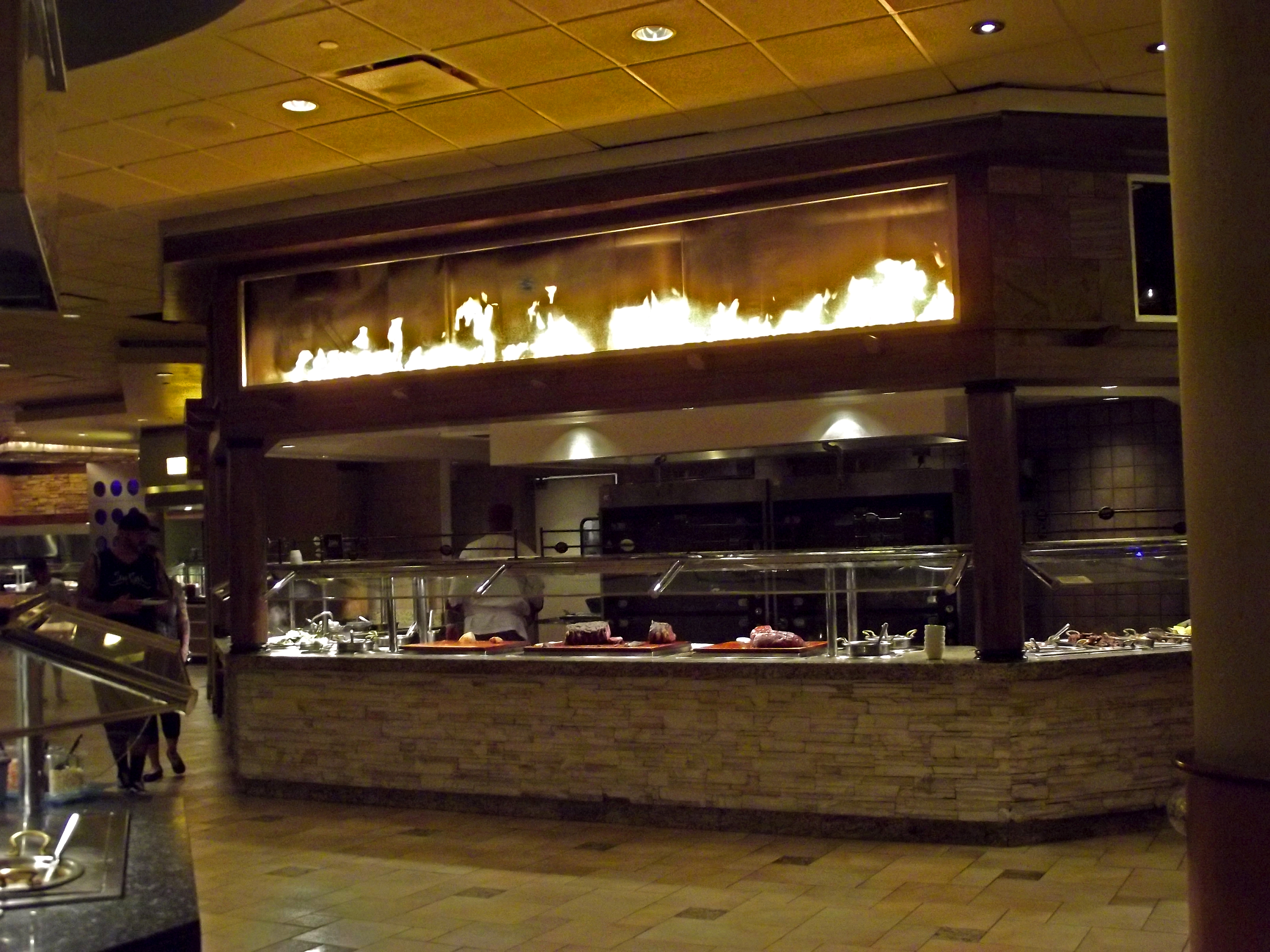
Carnival World Buffet, 2014

The property added four new restaurants beginning in 2002. Among them was Rosemary's, which replaced Napa after Palladin's death in 2001. Another addition was the Gaylord Indian restaurant, part of a worldwide chain. In 2006, musician Prince opened an Asian restaurant known as 3121 Jazz Cuisine, named after his recent album 3121.

In 2011, the Rio added a Burger King Whopper Bar. It seated 58 people, and was one of five Whopper Bars in the U.S. Unlike typical Burger King locations, it offered beer and included a hamburger bar with 30 toppings and sauces. It was replaced by a Smashburger in 2016.

KJ Dim Sum, a 4,600 sq ft (430 m^{2}) dim sum restaurant, was added in 2012, with seating for 350 people. Gaylord, a longtime Indian restaurant, was renovated and renamed as Royal India in 2013. Hash House a go go opened a location in 2014. Guy Fieri opened a Mexican restaurant, El Burro Borracho, at the Rio in 2016, replacing a seafood restaurant known as Buzio's.

The Carnival World Buffet was frequently considered among the best in Las Vegas, and was the city's largest buffet as of 2011, with seating for 733 people. The Seafood Village Buffet was merged into the Carnival World Buffet in 2015. The buffet closed during the pandemic and never reopened. As part of Dreamscape's renovations, the buffet was replaced by the Canteen Food Hall, which opened in January 2024. Dreamscape stated that the buffet did not make economic sense, especially in light of the pandemic. The food hall concept was inspired by one already present at the nearby Cosmopolitan resort.

=== Sapphire Pool ===
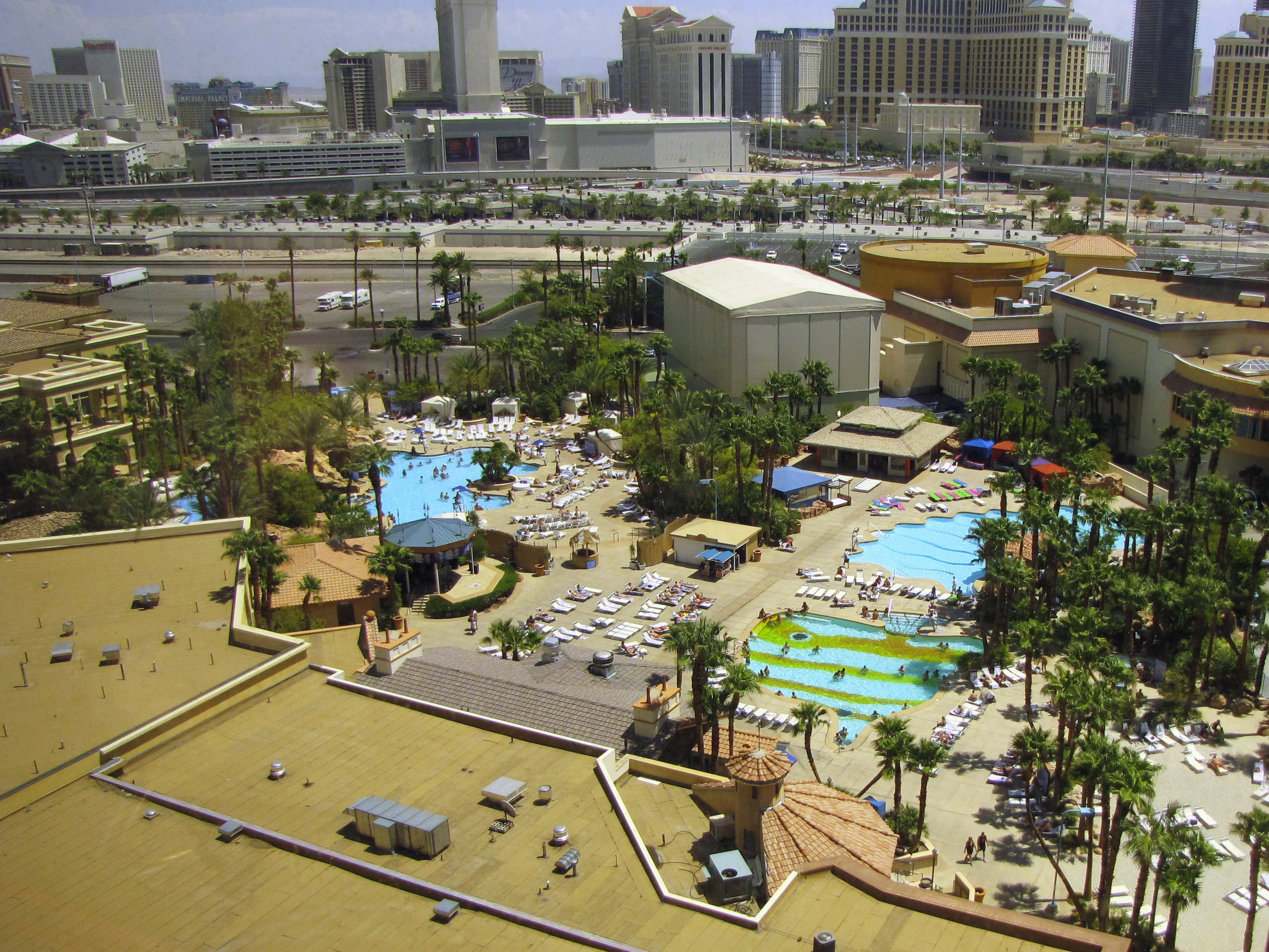
The Rio's pool area, August 2009

On May 30, 2008, the Rio opened the Sapphire Pool in conjunction with Sapphire Gentlemen's Club. The daylight-hour, adults-only club surrounded one of the property's outdoor pools and featured dancers. It opened with a $30-per-male-customer admission price. The venture was a high-profile joint venture between a casino company and a topless business, and was notable because the possibility of bringing in criminal activity at the club had caused the Nevada Gaming Control Board to balk at previous collaborations; some in the media questioned whether the risk was worth the potential payoff for the hotel.

In late July 2009, the Rio hotel asked the Las Vegas Metropolitan Police Department (LVMPD) to do a routine undercover investigation of the Sapphire Pool, as casino-resorts in Nevada are held responsible for the activities held on their premises. The request was a part of the resort's effort to show good faith to the Gaming Control Board. The July 25 visit resulted in 11 arrests. Upon finding out the results of the investigation, the Rio immediately shut down the pool.

=== Other attractions ===
From 1998 to 1999, the Rio hosted Treasures of Russia, an extensive collection of historic Russian memorabilia totaling 1,150 items, most of them loaned from the Peterhof Palace. The resort subsequently hosted Titanic: The Exhibition, in partnership with RMS Titanic Inc.

VooDoo Skyline was a 70-second zip line ride which opened in 2014 and closed in mid-2022. Riders started at the VooDoo Lounge atop the Masquerade Tower, and traveled a distance of 845 feet, stopping on the roof of the Ipanema Tower. Riders were then pulled back to the Masquerade Tower with the use of a pulley system.

Kiss by Monster Mini Golf is a franchise of the Monster Mini Golf chain. It is based on the rock band Kiss and includes an 18-hole miniature golf course, a rock and roll themed wedding chapel, the world's largest Kiss gift shop, and a museum featuring memorabilia from the band's career. It also hosts regular appearances by band members, both past and present. It opened in May 2016, in a 13,000 sq ft (1,200 m^{2}) space formerly occupied by the Seafood Village Buffet.

In 2018, the Rio opened the first phase of an esports venue known as Wall Gaming Lounge. It closed due to the COVID-19 pandemic and never re-opened.

== Shows and entertainers ==
From 1991 to 1992, the Rio hosted Tropical Heat, about a plane-crashed pilot who encounters Amazonian women. It briefly starred Dana Plato prior to ending. In 1992, entertainment producers Eunice and Blair Farrington opened the Brazilia revue in a small lounge. It received a positive reception. Farrington Productions subsequently produced a Latin-themed dinner show, Conga!, which opened in the Club Rio in 1994. Conga! was renamed Copacabana in 1995, and the Club Rio space was subsequently used solely as a showroom, undergoing a number of name changes through the years.

Impressionist Danny Gans began entertaining at the Rio in January 1997, in the 730-seat Copacabana Showroom. During his three-year run, the Rio raised ticket prices several times against his wishes, prompting him to sue the resort. He ultimately lost the legal battle. Other notable performers during the Rio's early years included The Beach Boys, Donna Summer, Tony Bennett, and Earl Turner.

The 1,470-seat Pavilion Theater was built at a cost of $35 million, and was opened in April 2000. The three-floor theater was designed to accommodate a rotation of Broadway-style musicals, each on a short-term basis. The venue was renamed the Samba Theatre shortly after opening. It opened with a tap-dancing show titled Tap Dogs, by Dein Perry. A musical, based on the movie Footloose (1984), also ran for 13 weeks in the new venue, closing in August 2000. Another showroom was built near the hotel's pool area and opened later in 2000, hosting the show De La Guarda, which included aerial performers and flashing lights. At the Copa, starring David Cassidy and Sheena Easton as nightclub singers, ran in the Copacabana Showroom from 2000 to 2001.

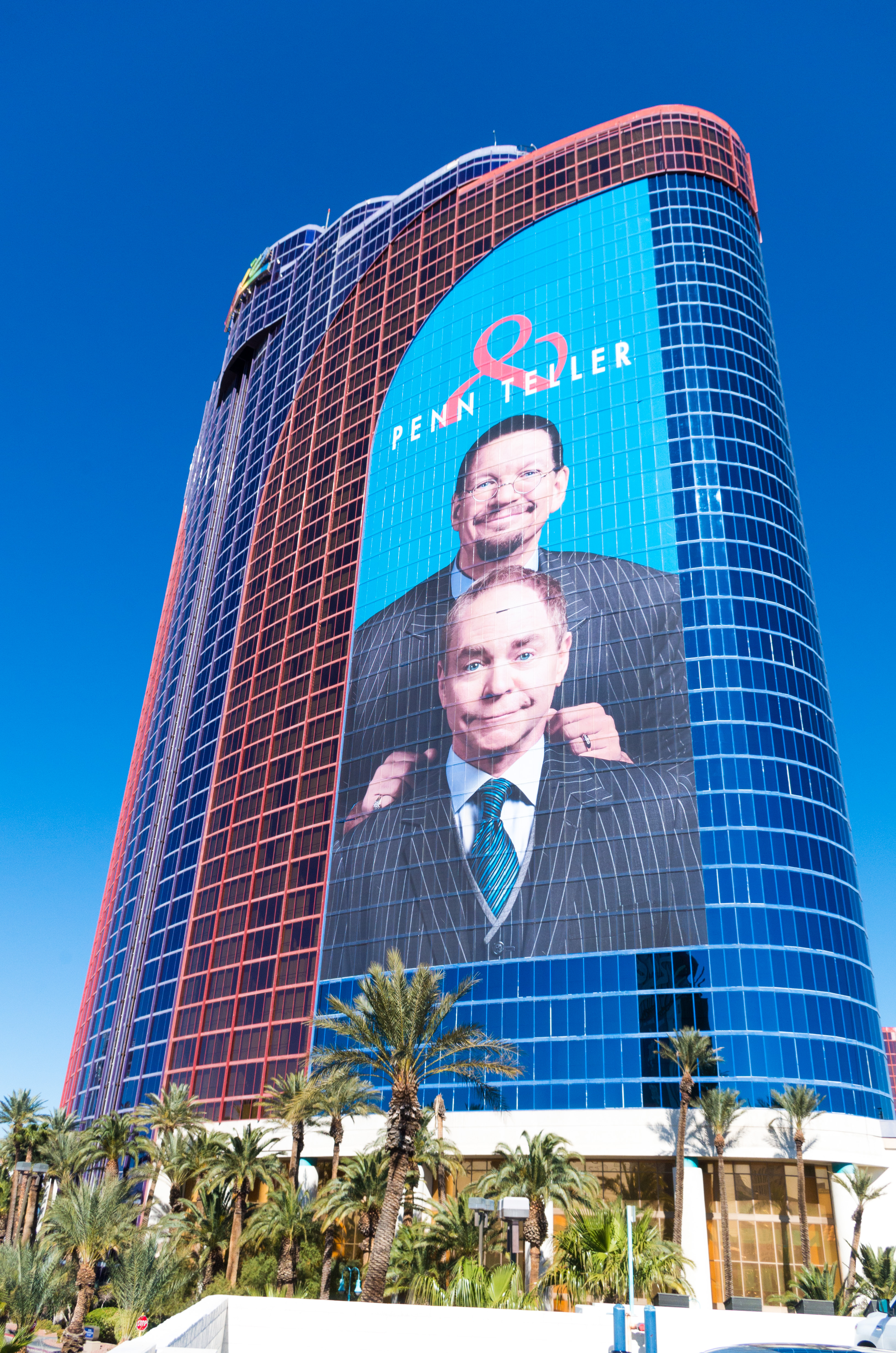
Penn & Teller advertisement on the Masquerade Tower

Magicians Penn & Teller began performing at the Rio in January 2001, and have continued to entertain there ever since. In the mid-2010s, they broke the record for longest-running Las Vegas headliner at a single venue. Their television series, Penn & Teller: Fool Us, is filmed in the same theater.

The Scintas also started performing at the Rio in 2001, as did ventriloquist Ronn Lucas. The following year, the theater launched Showgirls, which chronicled the history of such performers. The Rio also debuted Tony n' Tina's Wedding, replacing the unsuccessful De La Guarda. Tony n' Tina's Wedding continued its run there for seven years.

In 2003, the Rio introduced their "bevertainers," who worked as cocktail servers and as entertainers. When not serving customers, bevertainers would dance in 90-second performances on one of five stages located across the casino floor. The Rio had more than 80 bevertainers. Although the idea initially received skepticism, it would turn out to be successful.

Chippendales, a male revue, opened in 2002. The group shared the Scintas Showroom with the Scintas and Lucas, before getting their own venue at the Rio in 2004. The Chippendales theater had seating for 400 people and included an ultralounge, as well as a women's boutique retailer. The group performed at the Rio until 2024.

In February 2005, Erocktica opened in the Scintas Showroom. It was initially a topless dance show accompanied by a live band which performed cover versions of rock songs. The show was closed six months later for revisions, which changed the choreography and removed the band in favor of recorded tracks. It reopened later in 2005.

The Scintas departed the Rio in 2006. Prince subsequently turned the former Club Rio spot into the 3121 showroom, performing there from November 2006 to April 2007. The venue had capacity for 900 people, and was located next to his 3121 restaurant.

After Prince vacated the venue, it sat unused for several years, eventually becoming ND's Fuego nightclub in 2009, through a lease agreement. It was also known as ND's The Club during its brief lifespan. It closed four months later, after its owner filed for bankruptcy. Darin Feinstein, an owner of The Viper Room nightclub in California, leased the space and reopened it as Crown Theater in 2010. It also operated as a nightclub. Until 2014, the Rio hosted tribute shows for the Rat Pack and Michael Jackson.

In 2015, the Crown Theater opened Duck Commander Musical, based on the Robertson family and their television series Duck Dynasty. Millions of dollars were spent to renovate the theater for the show, which included 11 actors and a live band. The show performed poorly in box-office revenue, and ran for seven weeks, closing in May 2015.

Rock of Ages ran in the renamed Rock of Ages Theater during 2016. It was replaced a year later by a new water-themed variety show titled Wow - The Vegas Spectacular, featuring numerous performers. The show was well received, and had given more than 1,200 performances as of 2021.

The Comedy Cellar, a comedy club in New York, opened a Las Vegas location at the Rio in 2018. Raiding the Rock Vault opened at the resort in 2020. A new 286-seat entertainment venue, The Duomo, opened in June 2022, with Raiding the Rock Vault as its first residency show. The venue closed in October 2023.

The Empire Strips Back, a burlesque parody of the Star Wars franchise, opened in May 2025.

=== Masquerade Show ===
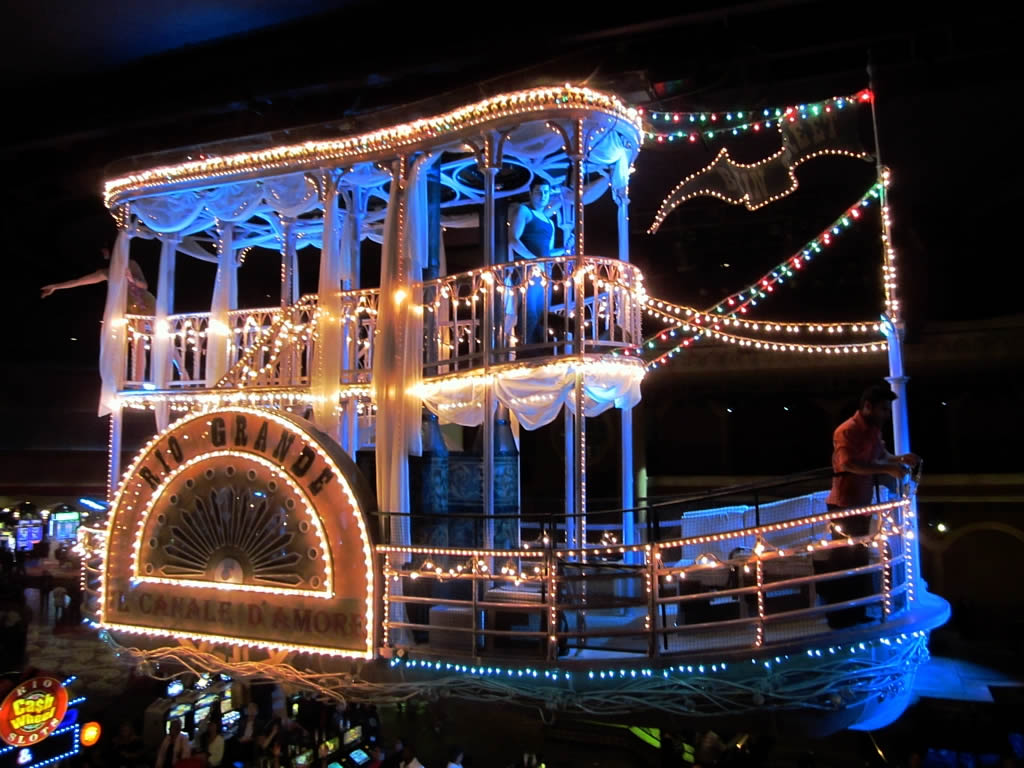
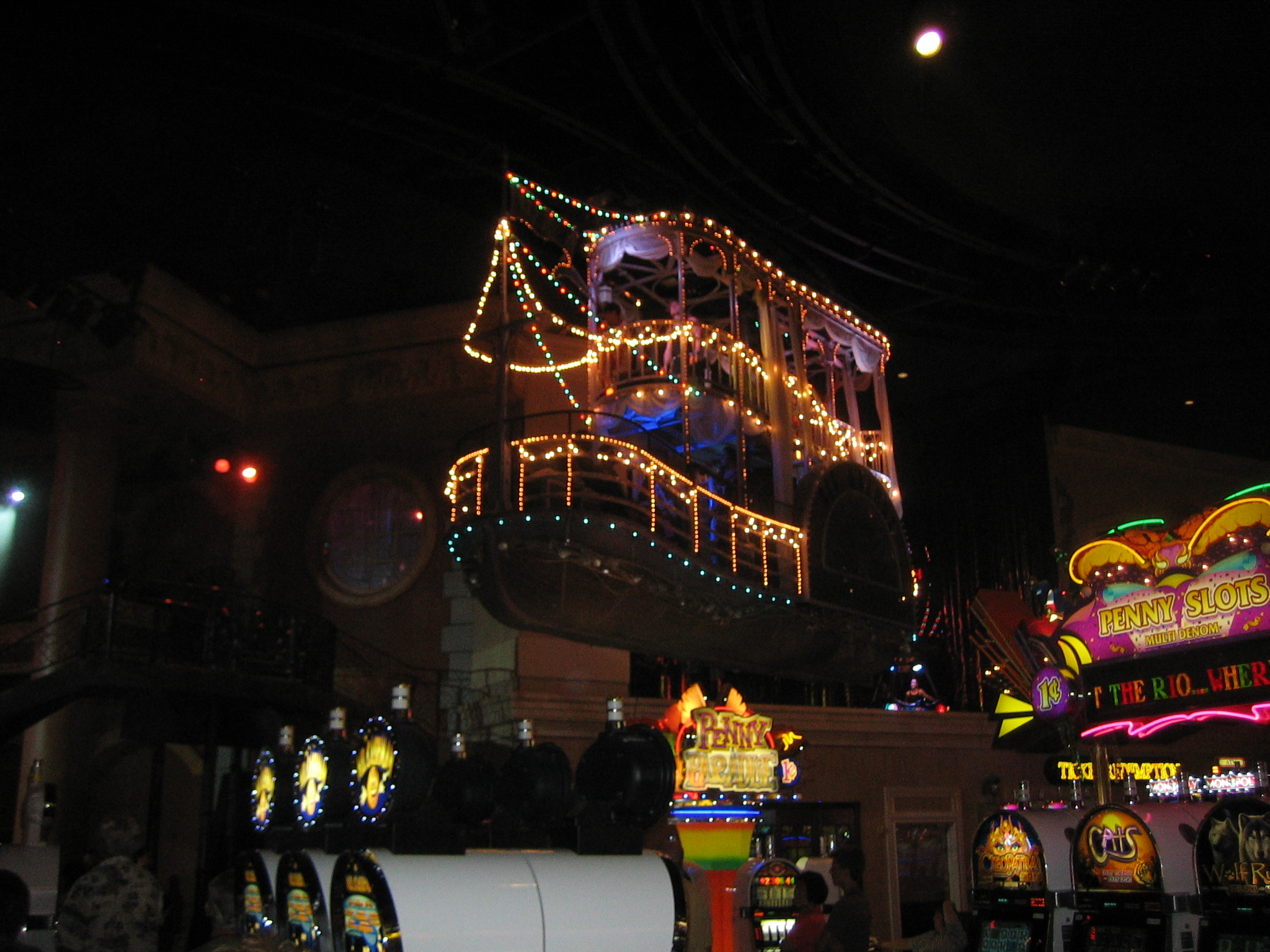
One of the floats used for Masquerade Show in the Sky

Masquerade Show in the Sky opened in February 1997, and ran in the resort's Masquerade Village. The $25 million show featured costumed performers and took place on floats which traveled along a 950-foot track, located 13 feet above the casino floor. The floats represented showboats and gondolas. Each float weighed between 13,000 and 17,000 pounds. They traveled at a speed of three feet per second. Masquerade Show in the Sky consisted of three distinct shows, and a fourth was added in 1998. The show was free to spectators, and visitors could also pay to ride in the floats.

The show was originally produced by Farrington Productions. The company's contract expired in 2001, and Dick Foster Productions was brought on to redo Masquerade Show in the Sky. The company sought to make the show more adult-oriented, adding sexier costumes and dances. The show was scaled back in 2008, and remained largely the same during its final five years. It closed in March 2013.

== In media ==
Regis Philbin taped several episodes of his talk show, Live with Regis, at the Rio's Samba Theatre in 2001. A year later, The Price Is Right taped a special episode in the theater, marking the first time in the show's 30-year history that it was shot outside of Los Angeles.

An episode for the second season of Raising Hope was filmed throughout the Rio in 2011. During the resort's closure in 2020, it was used as a secondary location for the second season of the American reality television series Love Island.

== See also ==
- List of integrated resorts
- Rio (disambiguation)
- Ríos (disambiguation)
