= Noel Lee (executive) =

American Inventor, manufacturer (born 1948)

- Born: December 25, 1948 (age 77); San Francisco, California; United States
- Education: San Francisco City College; California Polytechnic State University
- Occupation: CEO of Monster Inc.

Noel Lee (born December 25, 1948) is an American engineer, inventor, and businessman. He is the founder and CEO of Monster Inc.

Lee graduated from California Polytechnic State University with a bachelor's degree in mechanical engineering and subsequently did work in laser fusion for the Lawrence Livermore National Laboratory. He quit his engineering job in 1974 to play drums for a country rock band. After the band separated, he founded Monster Cable Products in 1979, based on loudspeaker cables he invented and manufactured in his garage.

Lee's audio cables met corporate resistance at first, because most audio cabling at the time was zip cord provided by audio vendors for free. Sales improved as retailers witnessed audio demonstrations and saw that his Monster-branded cables offered better profit margins than other electronics products. Lee is credited with building the Monster business and shaping today's audio components market.

== Early life ==
Noel Lee was born in San Francisco, California on December 25, 1948 to Chein-San and Sarah Lee. His parents named him "Noel" because he was born on Christmas Day. His father worked for the Republic of China's Central News Agency and Lee had four sisters. Lee's parents moved to San Francisco around the same time the Communist party took power.

Lee took an interest in music as a child; he described himself as having a more diverse taste in music than other kids his age. Lee's senior project was an effort to improve the quality of audio from electronics. According to Lee, his high school experiences were "rough" due to the level of discrimination against Asian-Americans at the time. Lee attended San Francisco City College, then California Polytechnic State University, where he earned a degree in mechanical engineering in 1971.

== Engineer and drummer ==
Noel Lee's first job out of college was as a laser fusion design engineer at a government-run nuclear research center called the Lawrence Livermore National Laboratory. On nights and weekends he played drums for an Asian country rock cover band called Asian Wood and worked on his home audio equipment.

In 1974, Asian Wood was given an opportunity to go on a world tour. Lee quit his job as an engineer in order to be the band's drummer. Asian Wood's members moved to Hawaii to start their tour, but it was cancelled two weeks later. The promoter wanted a straight rock band without country influences. This left Lee and his family stranded in Hawaii until they could earn money for travel back home. The band reinvented itself, covering Top 40 popular songs in order to attract work. Asian Wood took on other gigs around Hawaii for 18 months before breaking up. Lee continued doing solo gigs for six months after that, before returning to the Bay Area for an engineering job with Lawrence Berkeley National Laboratory. He also worked as an independent salesperson for several small speaker companies in San Francisco.

== Monster ==
Noel Lee is credited with turning the audio cable market into a "profitable cottage industry" and with changing the consumer mindset to see audio cables as a way to improve sound quality. He was awarded the Plus X Lifetime Achievement Award for his role in shaping a market and was named Northern California Entrepreneur of the Year by Ernst & Young. The company he founded became a household name and market-share leader. Monster does not disclose its financials, but industry analysts estimate the company is "hugely profitable." Lee calls himself the "Head Monster" and calls the company culture the "Monster Attitude." The company, while still best known for audio wiring, now carries 6,000 different products, such as headphones and home theater components. Its products are sold in more than 15,000 stores and it owns over 375 patents. Monster became one of the largest employers in the Bay Area.

=== Origins ===
In the late 1970s, Noel Lee wanted to improve the sound quality from his home audio equipment. He didn't have very much money, so Lee experimented with ways to create a better sound by improving inexpensive cabling. At first he worked out of his family's apartment and later in his in-laws' garage, which they rented from family after moving to the Richmond district in 1978. Lee experimented with different widths, winding methods, and qualities of copper and insulation in audio cables to find an alternative to the zip cord audio vendors gave out for free. He compared different wire constructs, while listening to Tchaikovsky's 1812 Overture.

Lee called the 12-gauge audio cable he created "Monster" due to its size. According to Vision Magazine, the first Monster cable was "a low-resistance twin-axial stranded design." Lee manufactured the cable by hand on a ping pong table and sold it door-to-door. According to Lee, Pacific Stereo was the first electronics retailer to give him a chance to sell Monster cables in their store.

Lee spent $50,000 in personal savings to demonstrate the cables at the Consumer Electronics Show (CES) in Chicago in 1979, using a borrowed portion of someone else's exhibit area. Lee received a positive response at the event and founded Monster, Inc. (formerly known as Monster Cable Products) later that year. Lee received an order from a Canadian distributor for 30,000 cables. The distributor wouldn't pay until the products were shipped, so Lee took out a $250,000 bank loan to pay for the production of the cables. According to Lee, he started the company without business experience or a strategy.

Lee was met with resistance, because the audio industry at the time didn't believe cables made any appreciable difference in the sound and wire was generally provided for free. Lee demonstrated the difference between Monster cables and zip cord to convince consumers that expensive equipment was wasted on cheap wiring. Sales rose as retailers saw high profit margins selling the cables. Lee provided incentives to retail salespeople to sell the cabling, rather than spend money on advertising. Some critics say this practice creates aggressive salespeople.

=== Establishment and diversification ===
Within six years from when it was founded, Monster had $50 million in annual revenues and 400 employees. The company's growth was primarily due to Monster training sales staff at electronics stores to bundle the cables with other electronics purchases, an effort the company spent 15 percent of its revenues on by 1998. Lee kept the company private and grew the business, despite pressure to go public.

In connection with his background as a musician, Lee founded the record label Monster Music in 1999, signing Van Morrison's daughter Shana. Monster created numerous divisions as it diversified into other products, such as Monster Performance Car, Monster Game, Monster Photo and Monster Computer. By 2003, Monster produced more than 1,000 products, including power cords, gaming accessories and cooling products. According to a 2005 USA Today article, Lee and his company were developing furniture with high-end electronics built-in, wireless products to replace audio cords and a user interface to consolidate the consumer's control of their electronics. Lee and his son worked with Dr. Dre and Jimmy Iovine to collaborate on the Beats brand of headphones, which was later acquired by Apple for $3 billion in 2014. According to Business Insider, Beats Electronics denies that Monster had a role in the design of the headphones. Lee said Beats had no engineers on staff and it spent millions in research and development to get the product started, but that their contract was poorly constructed, giving all the intellectual property to Beats when it wasn't renewed.

In 2004, Lee bought the rights to the San Francisco 49ers football stadium, which was renamed to Monster Park. Citizens and local government protested that a public facility adopted a corporate name and a local ballot was passed to revert the stadium name after the four-year deal with Monster expired. The sponsorship was partially contentious due to a recent layoff of 120 local employees.

== Personal life ==
Noel Lee is divorced with two children. His son Kevin Lee, sometimes referred to as "Little Monster", started working for the company and developed the M-Design product line of high-tech furniture. Lee's son later quit Monster and started his own audio company Sol Republic in 2010. Lee has a degenerative nerve disorder that prevents him from walking without a wheelchair or Segway, which he says was caused by exposure to toxic doses of radiation when he worked as a fusion engineer at Lawrence Livermore National Laboratory.

Lee enjoys collecting gadgets and has a collection of old sports cars. He enjoys socialising with musicians and counts Carlos Santana and George Benson among his friends. He is a member of the Asian Business League of San Francisco. He donated $75,000 worth of audio cables to the Los Angeles Unified School District. Lee describes his business ethic as "24/7; sleep when you're dead." He lives in Hillsborough, California. Lee is also known for throwing large parties at the Consumer Electronics Show and spending time with celebrities at the event.
