= Monster Cable =

American consumer electronics manufacturing company

Monster Cable Products Inc.

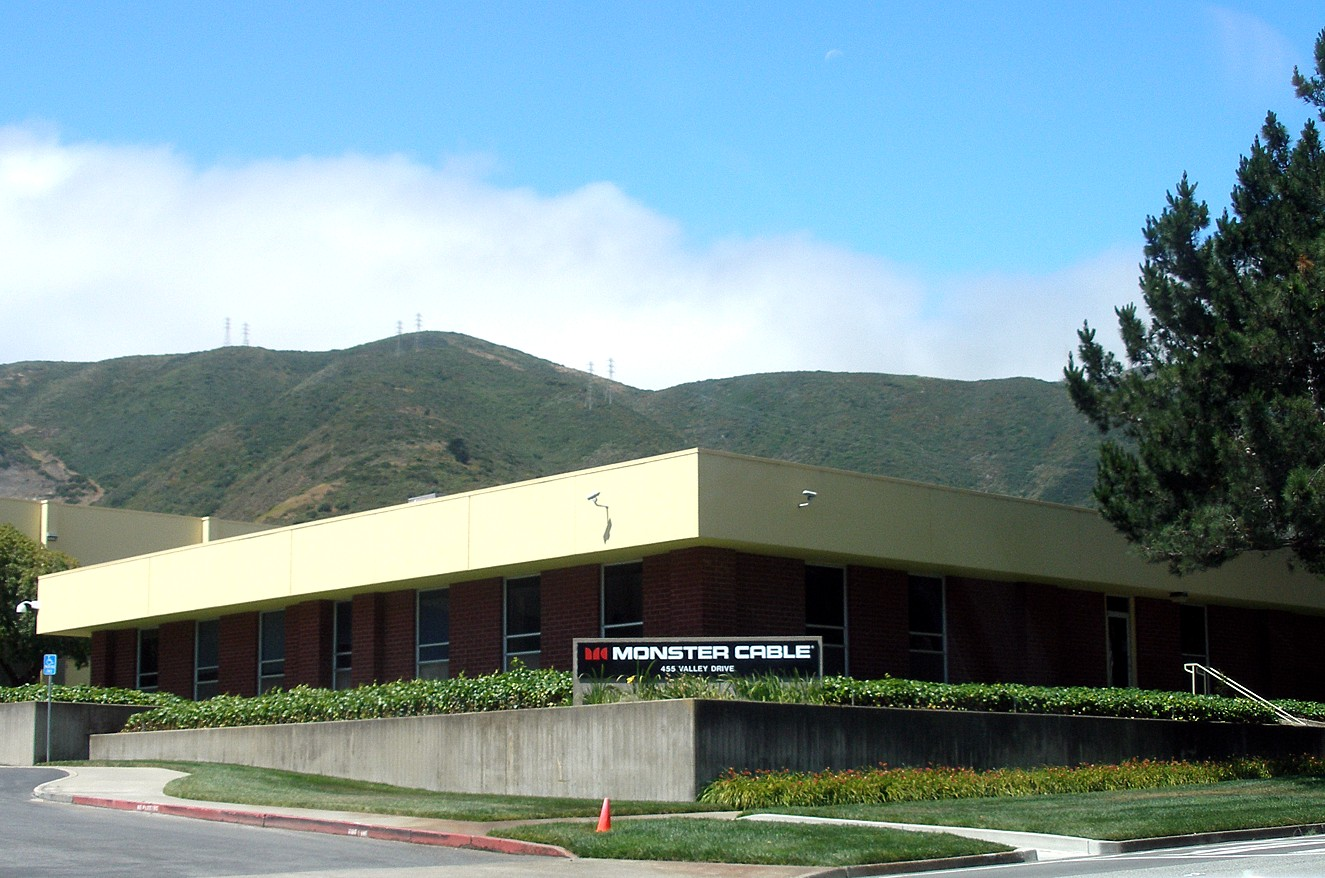
- Monster Cable headquarters in Brisbane
- Type: Private
- Industry: Consumer electronics
- Founded: 1979; 47 years ago
- Headquarters: Brisbane, California, U.S.
- Key people: Noel Lee (Founder & CEO)
- Products: Cables, HDMI cable, headphones, audio equipment
- Number of employees: 600+
- Website: monsterstore.com

Monster Inc. is an American company that manufactures and markets about 6,000 products, but is best known for audio and video cables. It also produces speakers, headphones, power strips, mobile accessories and audio devices for automobiles. The company was founded by an audiophile and engineer, Noel Lee, in 1979 by experimenting with different ways to build audio cables. It grew by doing demonstrations to convince the industry that audio cables made a difference in audio quality and by establishing relationships with retailers that were attracted to the cable's profit margins.

Over the years it created new divisions like Monster Music, Monster Game, Monster Mobile, Monster Photo and Monster Power. In the 2000s, Monster had legal trademark disputes regarding other companies or products that have "Monster" in their name, such as Monster.com and the Pixar film Monsters, Inc. Monster said it needed to defend its premium brand, while critics said it was pursuing litigation against companies that did not have confusingly similar products. It began manufacturing headphones in a partnership with Dr. Dre in 2008, which ended in 2012, and it created other celebrity branded or Monster-branded headphone products.

Tests done by audiophile publications, news reporters and academics reached conflicting conclusions on whether more expensive audio or video cables like those from Monster make a difference in audio or video quality when compared to generic cables. Instead of advertising, Monster offers incentives to retailers and their salespeople to sell the cables. Retailers bundle high profit-margin cables with larger purchases that have smaller margins in order to improve profitability.

== History ==
=== Origins ===
Monster was founded in 1979 by Noel Lee as Monster Cable Products. Lee, an audiophile and engineer, was experimenting with different copper qualities, wire constructs and winding methods of audio cables in his family's garage and comparing them while listening to Tchaikovsky's 1812 Overture. He became convinced that audio cables could be engineered to improve audio quality by conducting electricity more efficiently. Using a borrowed portion of somebody's booth at the 1978 Consumer Electronics Show, he did demonstrations of his cables in comparison to standard wires. After a positive reception at CES, he quit his job at Lawrence Berkeley Lab and started Monster Cable Products with $250,000 in bank financing. Monster's first cables were manufactured by Lee by hand and sold door-to-door.

Initial sales were slow, because at the time electronics retailers provided low-cost lamp cords to consumers for free or at low prices and audiophiles didn't believe audio cables made a difference in the sound. Monster is credited with creating the market for high-end audio cables in the 1980s through Lee's "marketing prowess". He did demonstrations comparing the audio of standard cables to Monster cables for retailers and trained their salespeople to do the same for customers.

=== Diversification ===
In 1980, Monster Cable Products moved out of Lee's garage and into a San Francisco facility. It also introduced its second audio cable, Interlink. The company grew through word-of-mouth and an increasing number of retailers that carried Monster products. It attempted to enter the market for audio devices for automotive briefly, but withdrew to focus on home entertainment. Its first product intended for the mass-market was introduced in 1987.

Monster re-entered the auto audio market in the early 1990s with a new line of speaker cables and its first speaker product, the Persona One. Its high-end M-series product line was introduced in 1992. It also expanded internationally, especially in Asia. Monster had a Taiwanese distributor file its trademark in the region, which led to the distributor continuing to sell products under the Monster brand after their agreement with Monster was terminated. This led to a lengthy legal battle and eventually a settlement. Monster acquired the Entec in-car audio brand in 1998.

Monster's program for retailers was formalized in 1993 as the M4 Dealer Success Program. The "M4" stands for four "M"s: Mix (product mix), Merchandising (displays), Monsterization (training) and Management commitment. In the 1990s, the business grew from $20 million in annual revenues to $100 million. By 1998, Monster was producing 1,000 different products out of a distribution and manufacturing center in Brisbane, California, that was established that year. It had created a record label company, Monster Music, in 1989, which was followed by Monster Power for power products such as power cords and surge protectors, in 1998, Monster Game for video game accessories in 2000 and the Monster Mobile division, which markets cell phone and digital camera accessories, in 2001. A Monster Photo product line was created in 2003 that includes power cells, cables and bags for digital cameras, followed by Monster Signature Series Power. In 2004, it created a spin-off called M-Design, run by Lee's son, which sells furniture with electronics built in.

=== Recent history ===
In September 2004, Monster paid $6 million in an agreement with the San Francisco 49ers and the city of San Francisco to rename the football team's home stadium from Candlestick Park to Monster Park for four years. $3 million of it was given to the football team and the other $3 million to the San Francisco Recreation and Parks Department. Critics of local politician Matt Gonzales said it was inappropriate for the city to sell the name of a public facility to a corporation, and a ballot was passed ensuring that the name of the park reverted to Candlestick Park in 2008.

Monster's first wireless products, a receiver and transmitter for connecting televisions and devices, were introduced in 2008. In 2012, the company changed its name from "Monster Cable Products" to "Monster Inc.".

Following the collapse of the Beats deal with Apple, Monster has sought a new sales strategy, forgoing traditional retail chains in favor of experiential sales at non-traditional spaces. Company founder Lee said [We're looking at] “alternative venues – like Barclays’ Center, stadiums where players can wear the headphone when they go in, and talk about how great the headphones sound. [We can] bring great-sounding music to a sports venue. We’re looking at cruise ships, stadiums, EDM concerts."

==== Trademark disputes ====
As of 2004, Monster owned about 300 trademarks, 70 of which are related to the word "Monster". By 2009, the company had made 190 filings with the U.S. Patent and Trademark Office. Most filings were to delay potentially infringing trademark applications so Monster could study them. Some were formal oppositions and about 30 resulted in lawsuits. Most lawsuits were settled with non-disclosed terms. Critics and defendants say that Monster is too aggressive in pursuing trademark protections against companies that do not have confusingly similar products and that it is trying to own a common word, not protect a brand. Monster representatives say they are doing what most "premium" brands do to protect their marks and that their products include things like clothes, mints and music.

In the 2000s, Monster had legal disputes over its trademarks with the Discovery Channel for its show Monster Garage. Monster also had trademark disputes with Bally Gaming International over its slot machines, Monster Slots, with Hansen Beverage Co. for its Monster Energy drink, and the Chicago Bears, who use the nickname "Monsters of the Midway". Other trademark disputes include a 2001 lawsuit against The Walt Disney Company for products related to the film Monsters, Inc., and a claim against an online used clothing retailer, MonsterVintage LLC. In 2004, Monster filed a complaint about the trademark application from Snow Monsters, a video website with skiing content for kids. The Snow Monsters owner initiated a lawsuit against Monster pre-emptively. It has also had a trademark dispute with the job site, Monster.com.

In 2006, Monster brought a suit against Monster Mini Golf, a company selling franchise Mini Golf locations throughout the US and Canada. After an unsuccessful legal mediation, Monster Mini Golf launched a grassroots campaign against Monster Cable on the Internet. As a result, Monster received more than 200 complaints from the public. Monster Cable dropped the lawsuit and agreed to pay up to $200,000 of Monster Mini Golf's legal fees. In 2009, Monster Cable CEO Noel Lee said on Fox Business that the company has had to balance their trademark protection efforts with the public's point-of-view.

In March 2008, Monster sent a cease-and-desist letter to Blue Jeans Cable, claiming that the "connector portion of the..cable infringes a variety of our client's design patents", relating to a variety of Blue Jeans Cable products. On April 14, 2008, Kurt Denke, the owner of Blue Jeans Cable, sent a public response letter to Monster Cable.

==== Headphones ====
Monster DNA headphones

Monster established a partnership with rap mogul Dr. Dre and Interscope Records in 2007 to design and manufacture the Beats Electronics line of headphones called "Beats by Dr. Dre". This led to a trend among headphone manufacturers to create celebrity-endorsed products. Monster created similar partnerships with Lady Gaga for the Heartbeats brand of headphones in 2009, P. Diddy's Diddybeats in May 2010 and LeBron James later that year. In 2010, Monster began developing a series of products for the Chinese market that were co-branded with basketball player Yao Ming. According to analyst firm NPD Group, the Beats brand that Monster distributed exclusively grew to own 53 percent of a $1 billion headphones market. A 51 percent interest in Beats was sold to HTC in August 2011. At the end of the five-year agreement between Monster and Dr. Dre in 2012, Dre decided not to renew. According to Bloomberg, both parties said the separation was "amicable" but they had disagreements on who deserves credit and the share of revenues. The partnership was responsible for a substantial portion of Monster's revenues. After the split, Monster created its own headphones product line and other celebrity-branded headphones with music groups Earth, Wind & Fire and Miles Davis.

==== Gambling ====
In October 2017, plans by Lee and Monster to enter the online gambling space were revealed in an exclusive story by Digital Trends. Citing a new sales strategy for alternative retail venues such as concert stadiums and sports arenas, Lee said a casino would generate revenue while allowing the company a place to sell its electronics. The casino deal connects Monster to the Iowa Tribe of Oklahoma and was signed June 20, 2017, bringing controversial figure Fred Khalilian to the company as the new COO. The gambling site PokerTribe.com will launch on or before December 15, 2017, Khalilian said.

== Products ==
As of 2010, Monster manufactured 6,000 different products, including headphones, speakers, surge protectors, televisions, and accessories for cars and mobile devices. The company is best known for its speaker cable. It created the market for high-end audio cables in the 1980s. According to a reporter from SoundStage Network, it "has retained a huge lead" for high-end audio cables ever since.

Monster also makes cables for TVs, DVD players, computers, printers, gaming consoles, and cameras, and for audio equipment in cars. As high-definition televisions grew in popularity, the company expanded into HDMI and high-def cables, including a lower-cost HDMI Basic and HDMI cables with five different speed ratings. It also produces cables intended for specific gaming consoles and Apple products.

Monster began manufacturing and marketing USB and Ethernet cables as well as power strips and power management products in 2009. It's been producing its own line of headphones since 2012 and also manufactures celebrity-branded headphones. Monster sells speakers under the Clarity and Katana brands and mobile accessories like an iPod dock and a line-up of Tron-branded products.

In the 2000s, it entered into markets for "lifestyle products" like amplifiers, speakers and furniture with electronics built-in, as well as wireless products.

== Pricing and performance questions ==
Monster audio cable

Tests by Stereo Review Magazine in 1983 concluded that Monster cables did not make a difference in the sound and were "indistinguishable" from 16-gauge lamp cord. Whether someone claims they can hear the difference varies from person to person. Many reporters and audiophiles have done double-blind A/B listening tests and are unable to hear the difference. According to PC Magazine, Monster is "often accused of selling over-priced cables that you can buy elsewhere for a fraction of the price".

Wired magazine said "with Monster, you pay a staggering premium for durability and good looks". Many reviewers stress that Monster HDMI cables are not needed for lower-resolution televisions or over short distances and that the difference in audio quality is not substantial enough.

== Relationship with retailers ==
Monster Cable and similar "boutique" cables are a substantial source of revenue for retailers of electronics, such as DVD players and TVs. While the profit margins of DVD players and TVs may be low, the profit margins of Monster Cables and similar products provide supplemental revenue for these retailers. Employees of such retailers are trained to market and bundle Monster Cable and similar products in order to increase profitability.

According to The New York Times, profit margins for retailers can be 40 percent or more and The Consumerist reported that one retailer was selling some cables at an 80 percent markup. This has led to criticisms that sales staff are motivated to sell high-end cable products to customers that don't need them and to be aggressive in order to obtain incentives. Monster has responded by saying that markups are determined by the retailer and are usually less than those found on clothing, jewelry and furniture.

As of 1998, Monster spent $13 million a year in training and incentive programs for salespeople. The sales staff are provided data on their performance in selling the cables and top-performers are sent on all-expenses-paid vacations. Monster also hosts its Retailer Awards at CES each year, which the Las Vegas Sun called, "one of the biggest events on the CES party circuit".

== See also ==
- Audiophile controversies
