= Jesse Hernandez (artist) =

American tattoo artist and graphic designer

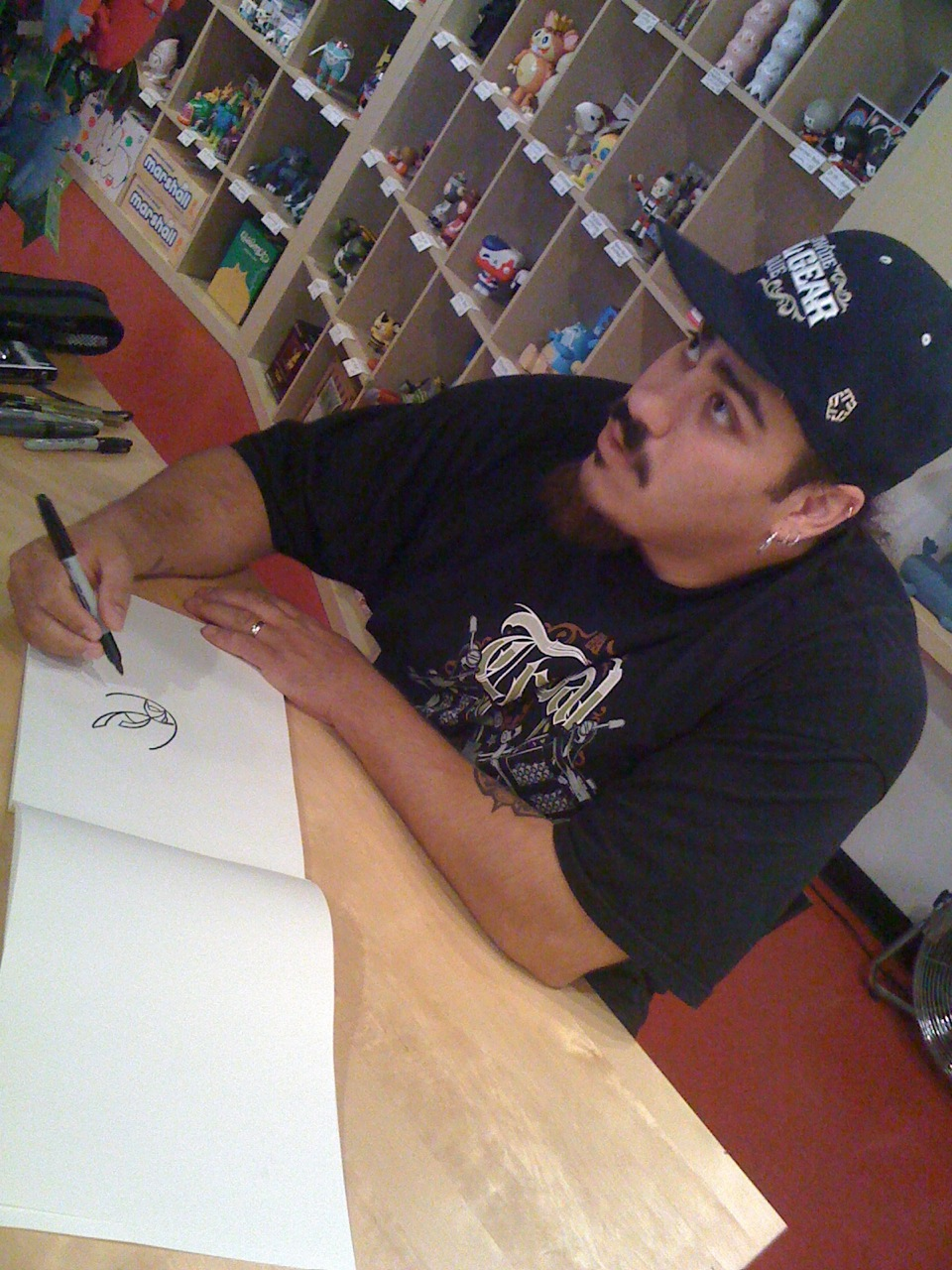
- Hernandez at the BIC Buddy release in 2009
- Born: Jesse Hernandez; San Francisco Bay Area, U.S.
- Occupations: Tattoo artist, graphic designer
- Years active: 1995–present
- Website: http://www.jessehernandez.net

Jesse Hernandez is an American tattoo artist and graphic designer for video games and collectible toys. He was a part of the urban vinyl art movement of the 2010s. Hernandez was also the lead character and prop designer on United Front Games' ModNation Racers. His designs have been featured on Kidrobot's Dunny toys, including one owned by singer-songwriter Usher.

== Biography ==
Hernandez studied fine art at the San Francisco Art Institute. He resides in Boyle Heights, Los Angeles, where he has commissioned graffiti-style murals on the walls of his home. Much of his art combines graffiti, Aztec art, and Native American art. Oaklandish described his style as "illustrations which straddle and explore the juncture between urban graffiti and ancient indigenous culture."

In 2007, Hernandez worked alongside Ramon Lopez on The Nutshack, a television series for Myx geared toward a Filipino American audience. In 2014, Hernandez painted a mural for the Oakland Museum's "Songs and Sorrows" Exhibition titled Danza de los Muertos. In 2015, Hernandez designed a brand of designer headphones for Sol Republic called "Urban Aztec". In 2021, he designed a cover for the annual National Novel Writing Month competition. He has also worked for Gears of War 4, and created artwork for the hip-hop group Run the Jewels.
