= Duncan McIntosh Company =

American publisher of periodicals

- Industry: Periodical publication; Events
- Founded: 1979; 46 years ago in Irvine, California
- Key people: Duncan McIntosh (president)

The Duncan McIntosh Company is an American publisher of periodicals which owns Sea Magazine and Boating World. In addition to its publications, the company also owns the Newport Boat Show and the Lido Yacht Expo.

The Duncan McIntosh Company was incorporated in 1979 and is headquartered in Irvine, California. As of 2017, its president was Duncan McIntosh.
