= Nana, Bangkok =

Intersection and neighborhood in Watthana District, Bangkok, Thailand

Coordinates: 13°44′31.73″N 100°33′10.73″E

Nana นานา
- Neighbourhood
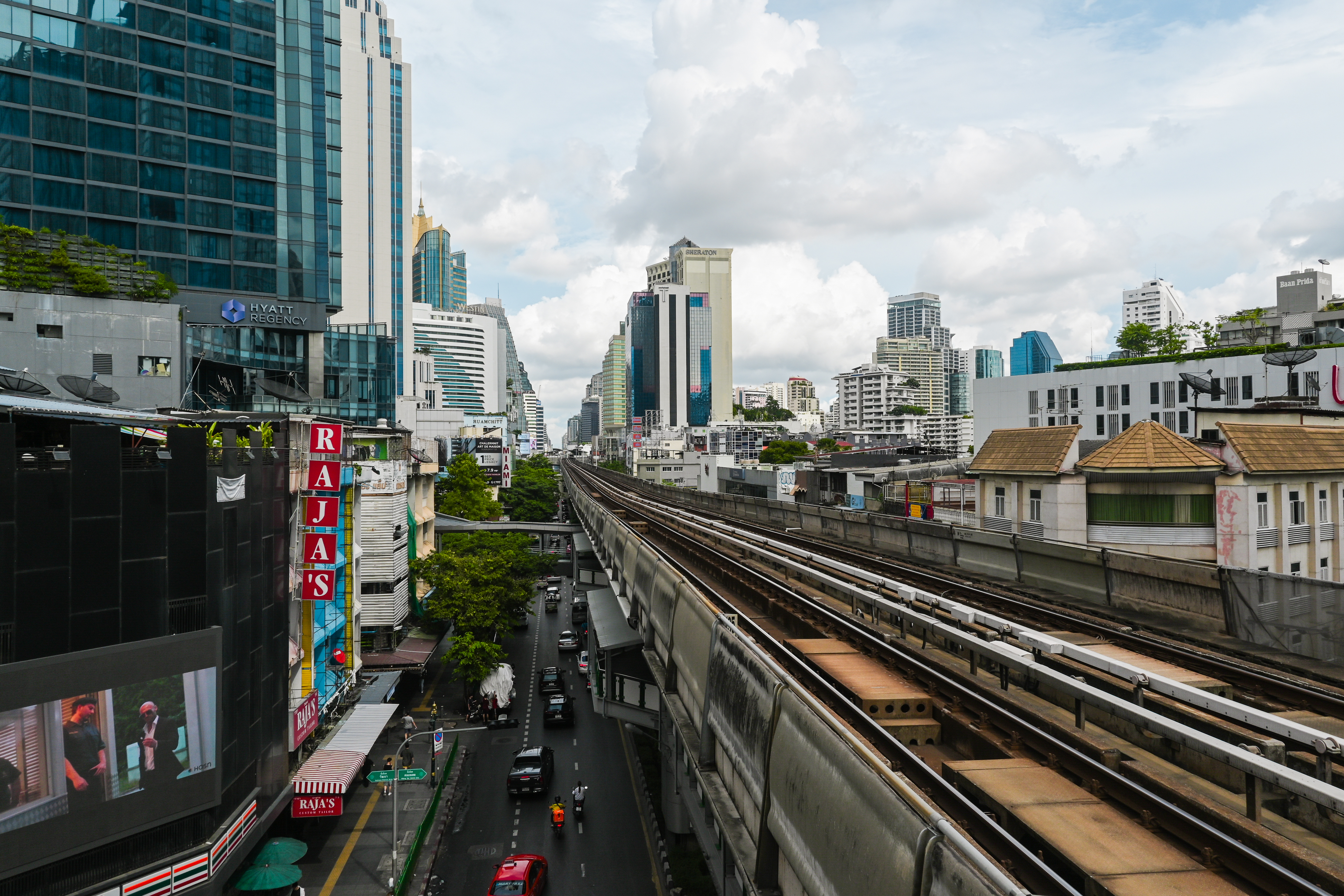
- View of east Nana from the Nana BTS station, 2023.
- Interactive map of Nana
- Country: Thailand
- Province: Bangkok
- District: Khlong Toei and Watthana
- Established: 1950s
- Named for: Nana family

Nana (Thai: นานา, pronounced [nāːnāː]) is an intersection and neighbourhood at the beginning of Sukhumvit Road (Highway 3) in Khlong Toei Subdistrict, Khlong Toei District and Khlong Toei Nuea Subdistrict, Watthana District, downtown Bangkok in Thailand. Soi Nana, off the Sukhumvit Road, also has the Nana Hotel and the Nana Plaza entertainment complex, later of which is famous for its nightlife as a red-light district.

Nana is a precinct located east of the centre of Bangkok near Asok. It is confined to the area between Soi Sukhumvit 3 and 11 to the north of Sukhumvit Road, and Soi Sukhumvit 4 and 8 to its south. Given Nana's division into two by the road, the northern portion between is named Nana Nuea (North Nana), and the southern area is Nana Tai (South Nana).

Established first as an Indian enclave in the 1950s, Nana became focused on tourism as a result of the influx of American soldiers on rest during the Vietnam War. After the war, it began catering to other Westerners, Asians and Middle Easterners. In particular, its popularity amongst Middle Eastern tourists led to it becoming a tourist enclave for Middle Easterners.

== History ==
=== Establishment ===
As urban Bangkok expanded eastward from its original location along the Chao Phraya river, construction on Sukhumvit Road began in 1936 as a continuation of Phloen Chit Road - connecting Bangkok to Trat. Construction ended in 1950. Following the completion of Sukhumvit road, Indian migrants settled around the modern location of Nana where they established their own businesses, the most numerous being tailor shops, restaurants, and shops. Prior to the influx of American soldiers in the 1960s, most of the area were paddy fields.

The Thepadia family had immigrated to Siam during the reign of Mongkut from Gujarat in British India and worked in the textile industry by making woven fabrics from material only royalty and high-ranking officials could afford. For his service in supplying the royal palace, family patriarch Alisai Ahmad Thepadia was granted the title Phra Phichet Sanpanit. Supposedly, when he had an audience with Chulalongkorn, the king encouraged Alisai to change the family's name to nana due to it being easier for Thais to pronounce. In Gujarati, nana means "little children" and was said by Alisai when he was trying to control his children at the audience.

Alisai's son, Ahmad Ibrahim Nana (father of Lek Nana), became a prominent businessman and helped diversify the family's business into land ownership. In 1930, he bought a large tract of land between Soi Sukhumvit 1 and Watthana Intersection. The Nana family thus owned a majority of the land on either side of Sukhumvit Road in the modern-day Nana area, which is named after them. Prior to being called Nana, the area was called Thung Bang Kapi (Thai: ทุ่งบางกะปิ).

=== Tourism growth ===
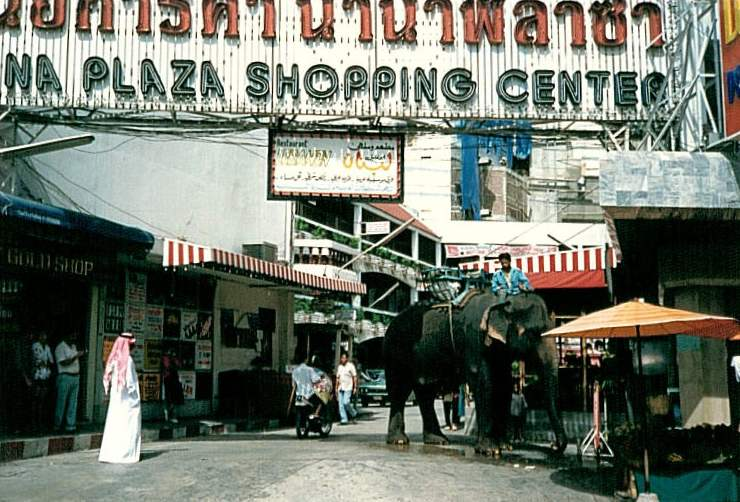
Entrance to the Nana Shopping Centre (now Nana Plaza) in 1980.

The influx of American soldiers on R&R during the Vietnam War greatly changed Nana's economy and was part of the same change that occurred to Pattaya, Patpong, and Soi Cowboy whereby Nana became increasingly focused on tourism. Whilst on leave, they rented accommodations in the Sukhumvit area due to convenience and the availability of hotels and rentals. To exploit the new market of tourists, nightclubs, bars and restaurants emerged alongside the creation of a sex industry in Nana. One of the first hotels built was the Chavalit Hotel on Sukhumvit 11, later developing into the Ambassador Hotel.

The end of the war in early 1975 led to a momentary decline for commercial activities in Nana before the main consumer base shifted to general Westerners. The late 1970s also saw increased tourism from Middle Easterners of the Gulf States who saw increased spending power. Japanese and Koreans came in smaller waves.

== Demographics ==
Within Bangkok, Nana historically served as an ethnic enclave for Indian migrants. Nana's permanent population also includes - amongst other smaller groups - Thai, Burmese, Isan and Lao people.

As a popular tourist destination, prominent tourist populations include Westerners, Middle Easterners and East Asians. Western tourists mainly originate from either Australia, Europe or the United States, while Middle Eastern tourists mainly come from either Egypt, Kuwait, Oman, Saudi Arabia or the United Arab Emirates. Other Asian tourists originate mainly from either India or China. As a result of its nightlife and commercial areas, Nana draws in numerous hedonist tourists. Given the diversity of Nana, a variety of languages are spoken - with Thai and English being the most popular. Besides Thai and English, signage in the area is also written in other languages. In 2003, it was one of four Bangkok neighbourhoods where a majority of commercial signs were in a language other than Thai, with English being frequently used with Japanese and Arabic. About 38% of all commercial signs contained Arabic writing.

== Economy ==
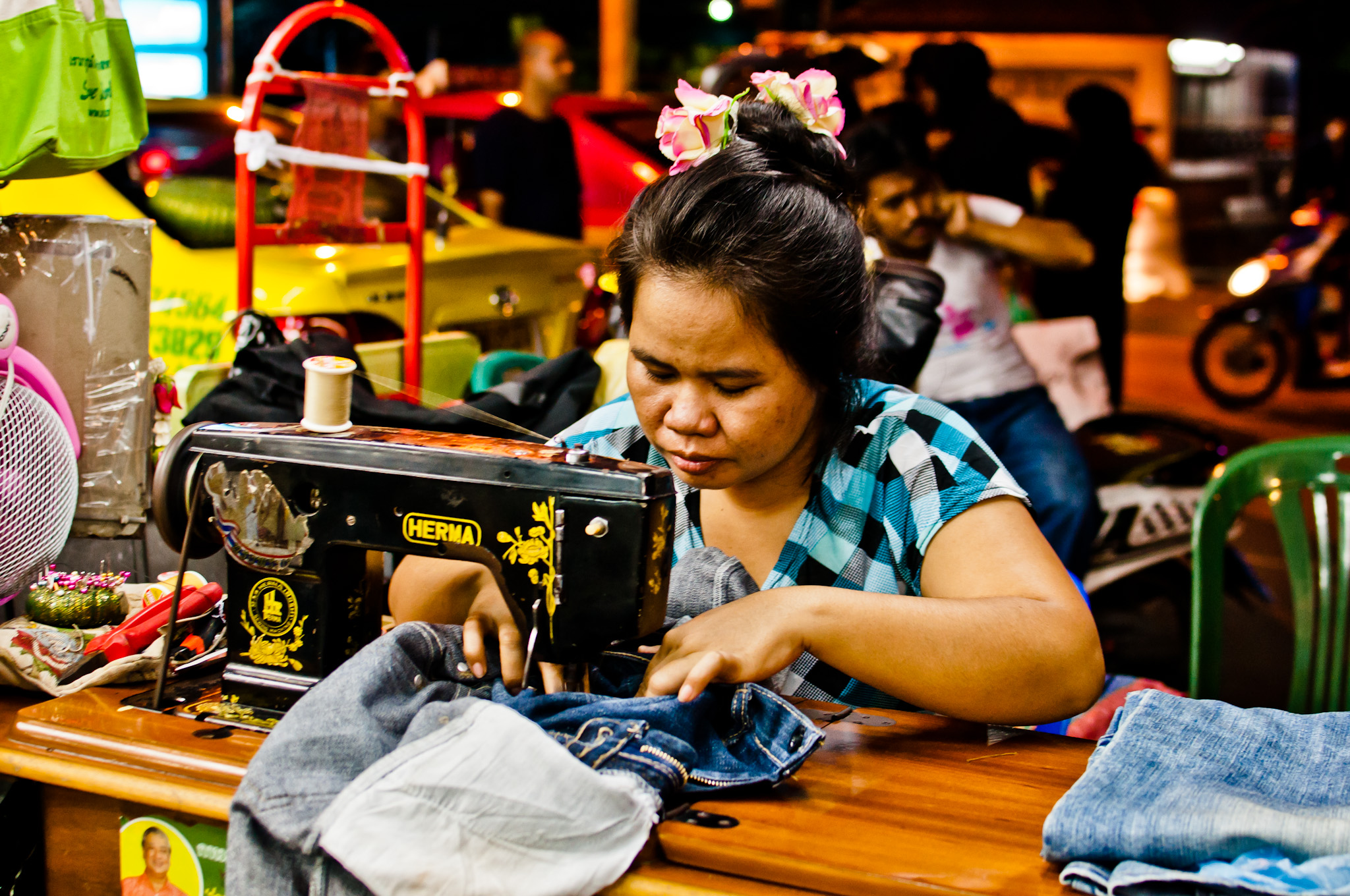
A street seamstress working along Soi Sukhumvit 3, 2012.

Within the Sukhumvit area of Bangkok, Nana is among the area's major economic areas along with Asok, Phrom Phong and Thong Lo. It is a popular tourism area in Bangkok and many businesses cater to them. Restaurants, catering to a variety of tourist types, serve a range of food ranging from Halal, Indian, Western, and Thai cuisine. Additionally, there is a variety of shops, with the largest being the Nana Square shopping mall. The Nana Hotel on Soi Sukhumvit 4 opposite Nana Plaza is one of the area's older hotels, established in 1963 as a 5-storey building catering to American soldiers staying around Nana. In 1973, the hotel was expanded with the opening of a new 14-storey building. It has, however, developed a reputation for some of its guests engaging in sex tourism in the area - being labelled the "Brandy Hotel" in Christopher G. Moore's stories of Vincent Calvino. Hotels are generally within the 2 to 4-stars range, although there are a few 5-stars hotels.

Since the 1990s, Thailand's medical tourism industry has been growing. Located on Soi Sukhumvit 3, Bumrungrad International Hospital is one of the largest private hospitals in Southeast Asia.

=== Nightlife and sex industry ===
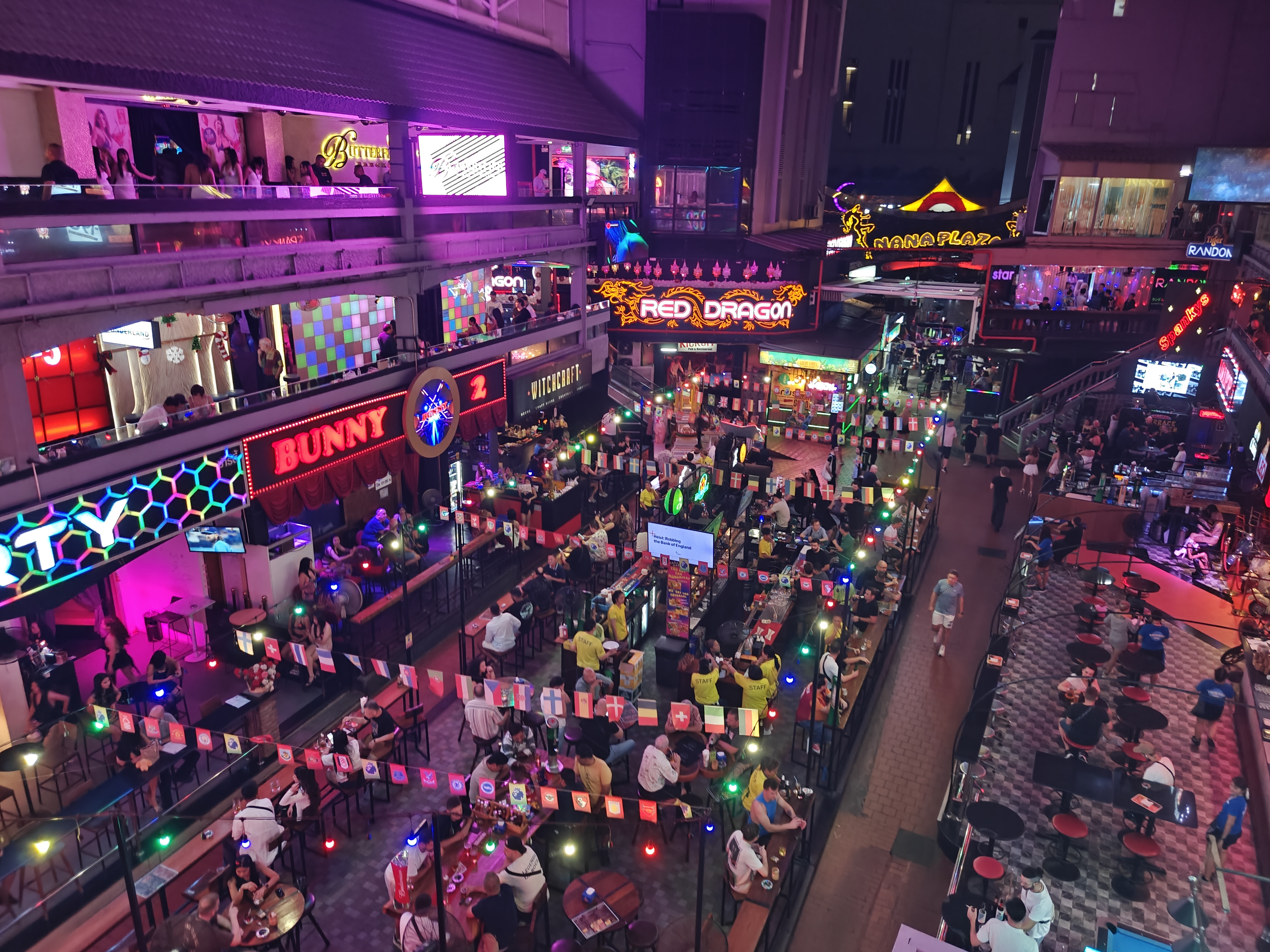
The interior of Nana Plaza at night, November 2025.

Although prostitution is not legal and public solicitation for prostitution is outlawed, the sex industry has remained an integral part of Nana's economy and nightlife. In addition to Thai sex workers, foreigners also operate as sex workers. Nana, specifically Nana Tai which includes Nana Plaza, is one of Bangkok's largest and most prominent red-light districts along with Soi Cowboy and Patpong. Nana Plaza is the centre of Nana's sex-industry. It is a three-storey complex with female and transgender (ladyboy) prostitutes. Transgender prostitutes are also known to operate as hookers on Soi 4.

=== Transportation ===
Nana is served by the BTS Sukhumvit Line at Nana Station, with Phloen Chit before it and followed by Asok. The station is part of the BTS Skytrain system and was opened on 5 December 1999. It is one of the original stations that has operated since the BTS Skytrain first opened in 1999. Ferry services are also available at the northern edge of Nana via the Khlong Saen Saep boat service at the Nana Nua Pier. The preceding pier is called Nana Chard, although it is a little outside of Nana's boundaries. Nana Nua is part of the NIDA (eastern) line that runs between Pratunam and Wat Sri Bunrueng near the National Institute of Development Administration (NIDA).

== Sites ==
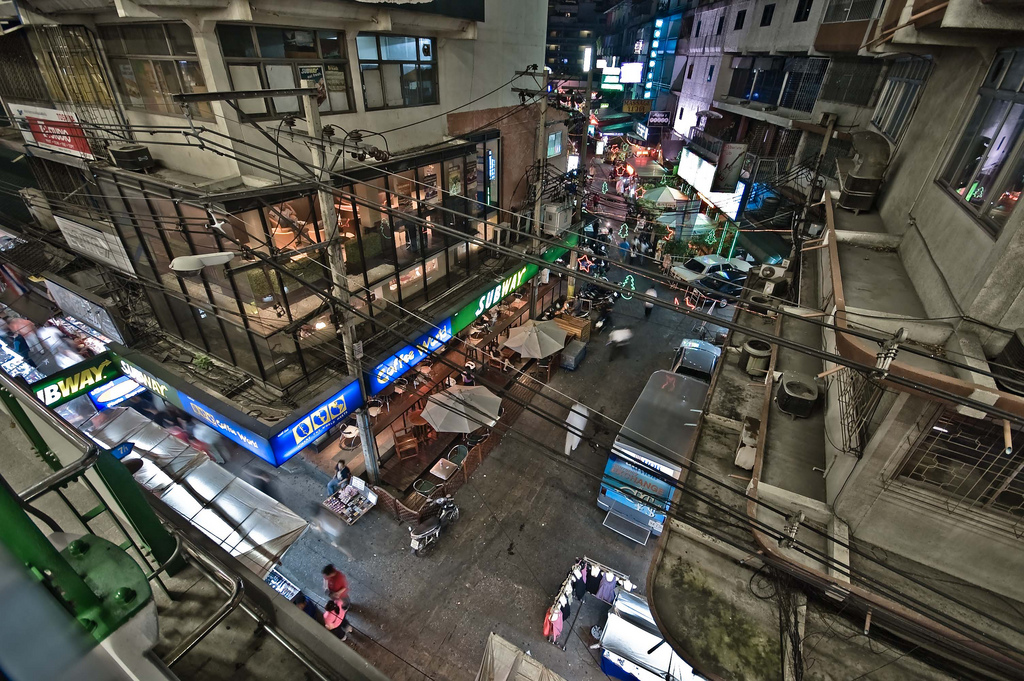
Shops along a soi as viewed from the Nana station, November 2007.

In the southern part of Soi Sukhumvit 4 is the BSB British International Primary School, which was established in 1992 and teaches according to the National Curriculum for England.

Religious sites in Nana include the Jai Saman Church on Soi 6. The Jai Saman Full Gospel Church follows Pentecostal Christianity. Canadian missionary William F. Butcher established the first Jai Saman Church around Yaowarat in 1963 and the branch in Sukhumvit was opened on 2 April 1972, with Nirut Chankon as the first pastor. Given the area's popularity with Muslims, Nana also contains three mosques.

Two embassies can be found in Nana, belonging to Sweden and Pakistan. The Embassy of Sweden is located within One Pacific Place on Sukhumvit Road between Soi 4 and 6. When the Swedish embassy in Phnom Penh was closed in 2021, responsibility for Cambodia was added to the Bangkok embassy. The Embassy of Pakistan is located on Soi 3, near Bumrungrad Hospital. The embassy is located within Nana's "Little Arabia" due to its popularity with Middle Eastern and Muslim tourists, and was established in the 1950s after bilateral relations between Pakistan and Thailand were established in 1951. The original smaller structure that contained the embassy demolished in the 2000s for a new building.

== See also ==
- List of neighbourhoods in Bangkok
