= Soi Arab =

Alleyway in Bangkok

Coordinates: 13°44′33″N 100°33′12.80″E

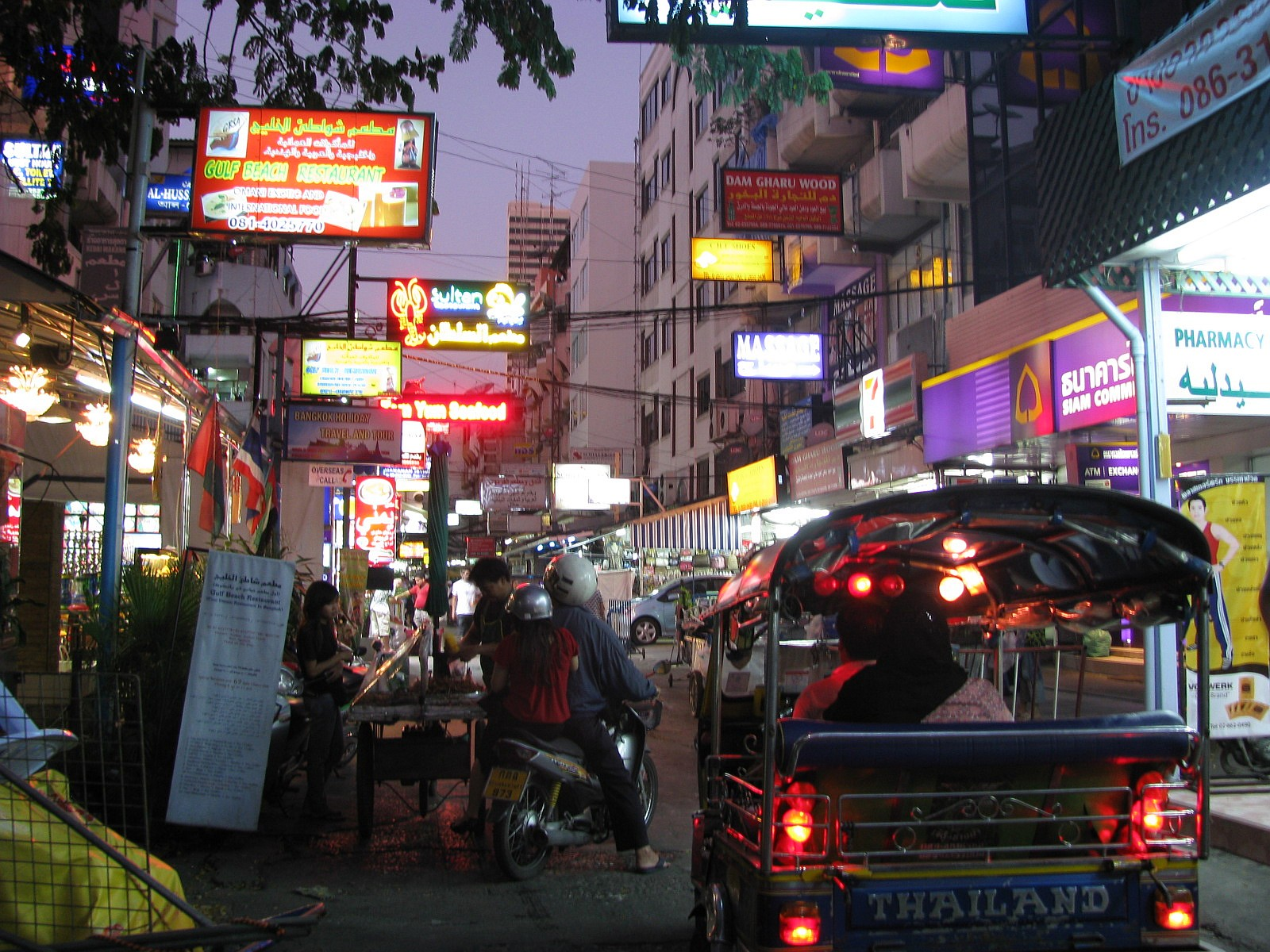
Soi Arab in 2009 showcasing the in Arab and English

Soi Arab (Thai: ซอยอาหรับ, RTGS: Soi Arap, pronounced [sɔ̄ːj ʔāː.ràp]), officially Soi Sukhumvit 3/1 and also called Arab Street, is an alleyway (soi) in Bangkok, located between Soi Sukhumvit 3 and Soi Sukhumvit 5. The area is named after the fact that the area is mostly occupied by Middle Eastern visitors and expatriates, with numerous Arab restaurants and shops. It is located not far from the Nana Plaza nightlife area and the Grace Hotel, which is popular among Arabs. Several restaurants in the area offer outdoors water pipe smoking, and shops offer expensive agarwood for sale.

== History ==
In 1983, the oldest restaurant on the soi, the Shahrazad opened and would later become popular among Arabs. Three years later, the Egyptian restaurant Nasir al-Masri was opened by Egyptians, serving Arab cuisine, along with small amount of Thai and Indian cuisine.

== Cuisine ==
Soi Arab's cuisine has been influenced heavily by Middle Eastern tradition. Food served here can trace their origins to several nations including Lebanon, Iran, Yemen, as well as India, Nepal and Thailand. Foods introduced by Middle Easterners include kebabs, turkish delight and hummus. The Soi is also popular among Ethiopians at Ethiopia Eats founded by Ambase Mohamed.

== Gallery ==
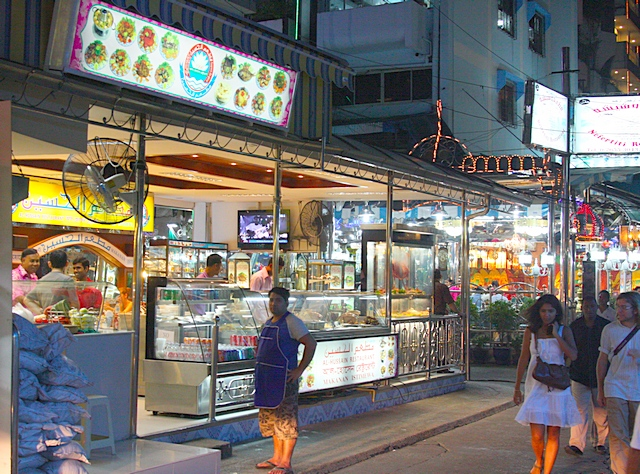

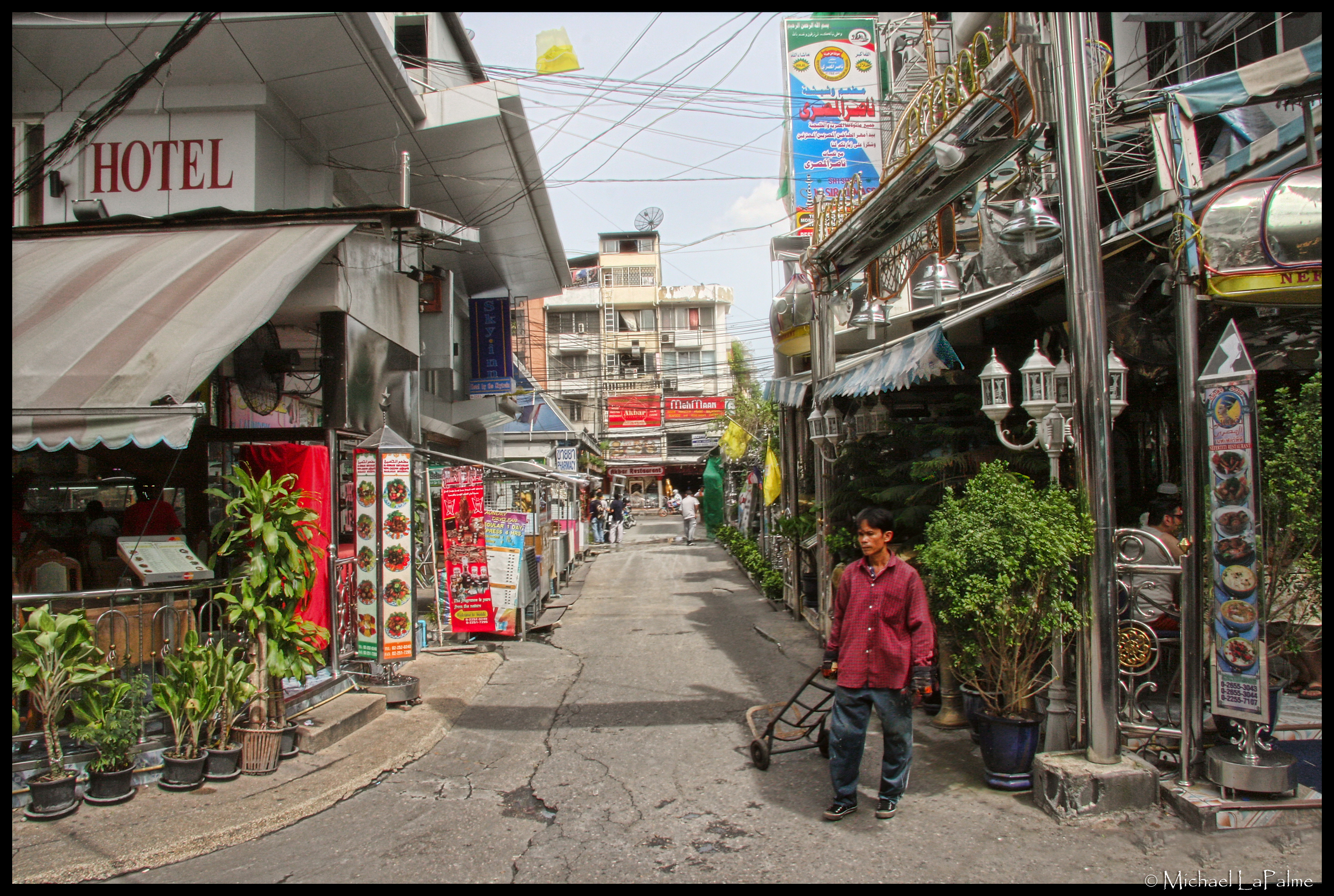

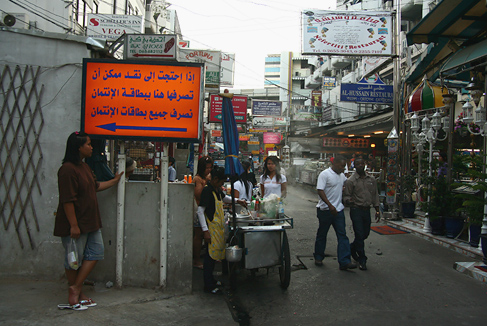
