= Lek Nana =

Thai businessman and politician

Lek Nana MPCh MWM
- เล็ก นานา
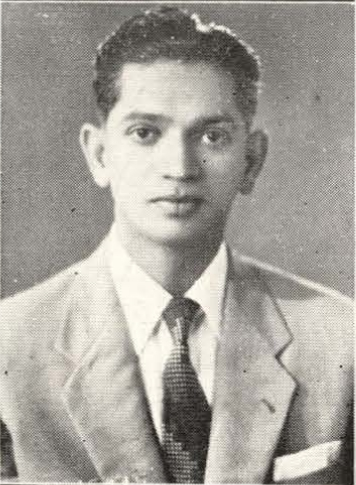
- Photo of Lek Nana taken before 1959

Minister of Science and Technology
- In office 28 August 1985 – 5 August 1986
- Prime Minister: Prem Tinsulanonda
- Preceded by: Damrong Latthapipat
- Succeeded by: Banyat Bantadtan

Personal details
- Born: 18 March 1924 Bangkok, Siam
- Died: 1 April 2010 (aged 86) Bangkok, Thailand
- Party: Democrat Party
- Spouse: Yuphadee Nana
- Profession: Politician, businessman

Lek Nana (Thai: เล็ก นานา; 1924 – 1 April 2010) was a Thai businessman and politician. He was one of the founders of Thailand's Democrat Party at the end of World War II. Lek Nana served as Deputy Foreign Minister as well as Minister of Science, Technology, and Energy. A Muslim of Gujarati ancestry, he was a senior member of the Central Islamic Committee of Thailand. The Nana area on Sukhumvit Road derives its name from him.

== Career ==
Nana became Deputy Foreign Minister in 1975 under Prime Minister Seni Pramoj, losing his office in the military coup that followed the October 1976 massacre of leftist protesters at Thammasat University.

He served as an honorary consul-general for Iraq in Thailand until 1981. In December 1982, a powerful bomb exploded in his office building in Bangkok's Chinatown, killing a police bomb disposal expert, injuring 20 other people, and causing a fire that damaged five buildings. Nana was not in the office at the time. His office had formerly been the Iraqi consulate, and a connection to the Iran–Iraq War was suspected to have been the reason.

In 1982, Nana became secretary general of the Democrat Party under party leader Bhichai Rattakul. He also served on the party's executive board repeatedly.

In 1985, Prime Minister Prem Tinsulanonda appointed Nana as Minister for Science and Technology, following the suicide of the previous minister, Damrong Latthapipat, said to have been displeased by the inadequate funding he had received.

== Legacy ==
Nana was nicknamed the "landlord of Bangkok" and owned a great deal of property along Bangkok's Sukhumvit Road, especially in the area now known as "Soi Nana" (Sukhumvit Soi 3 and Sukhumvit Soi 4). The name Nana is also used for the nearby Skytrain station, the Nana Hotel and the Nana Plaza entertainment complex.

A philanthropist, Nana donated land for the headquarters of the Democrat Party, for the Princess Mother Memorial Park, and for a hospital.

== Death ==
Lek Nana died of a heart attack in a Bangkok hospital in 2010 at the age of 86. He was buried at Ban Somdej Mosque in Thonburi, with royal representation from HM King Bhumibol Adulyadej.

== Bibliography ==
- Dubey, Tung Nath, India and Thailand: A Brief History, H.K. Publishers and Distributors, 1990
