= Waiting staff =

Service occupation

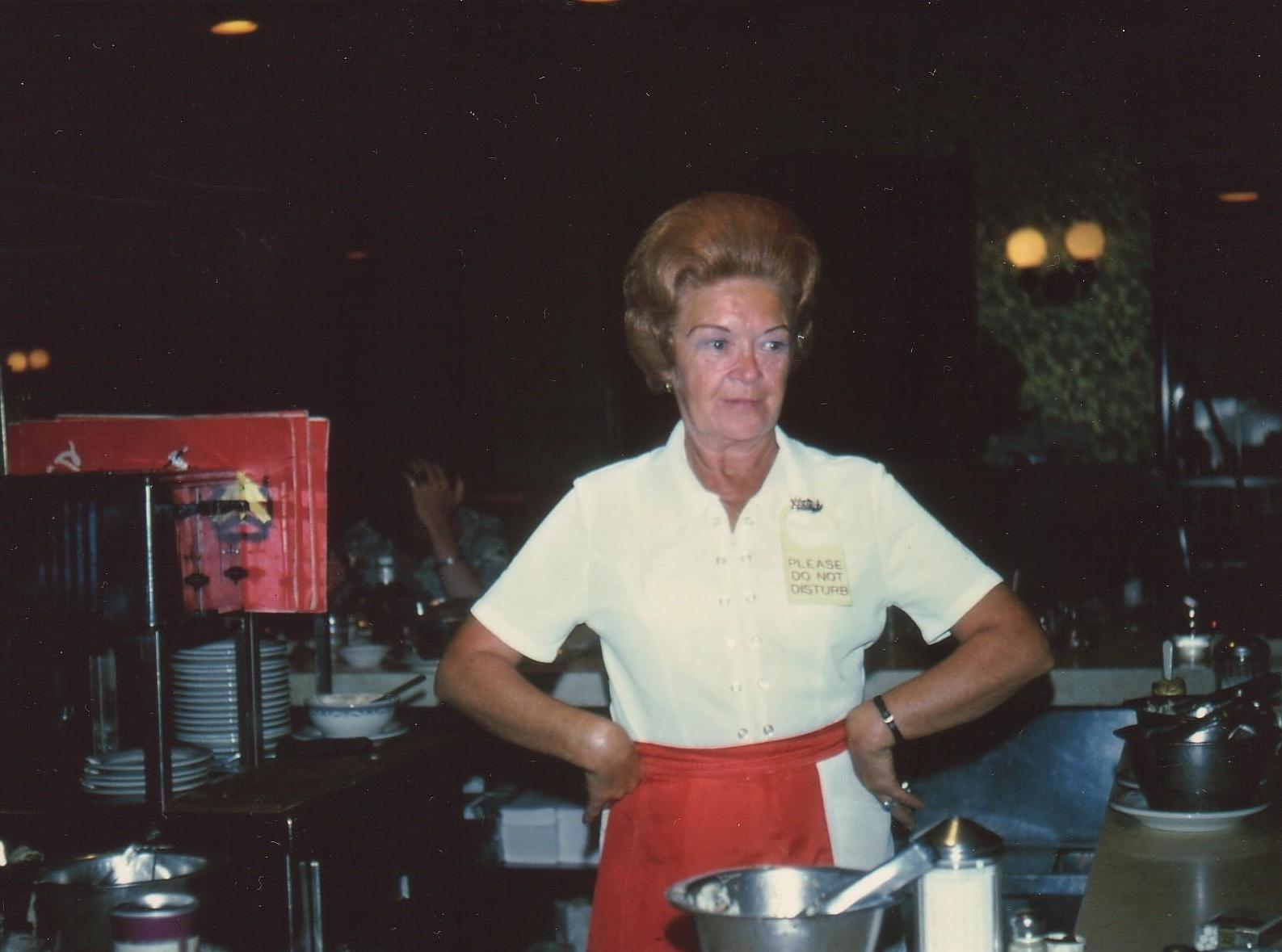
Miami Beach waitress in 1973

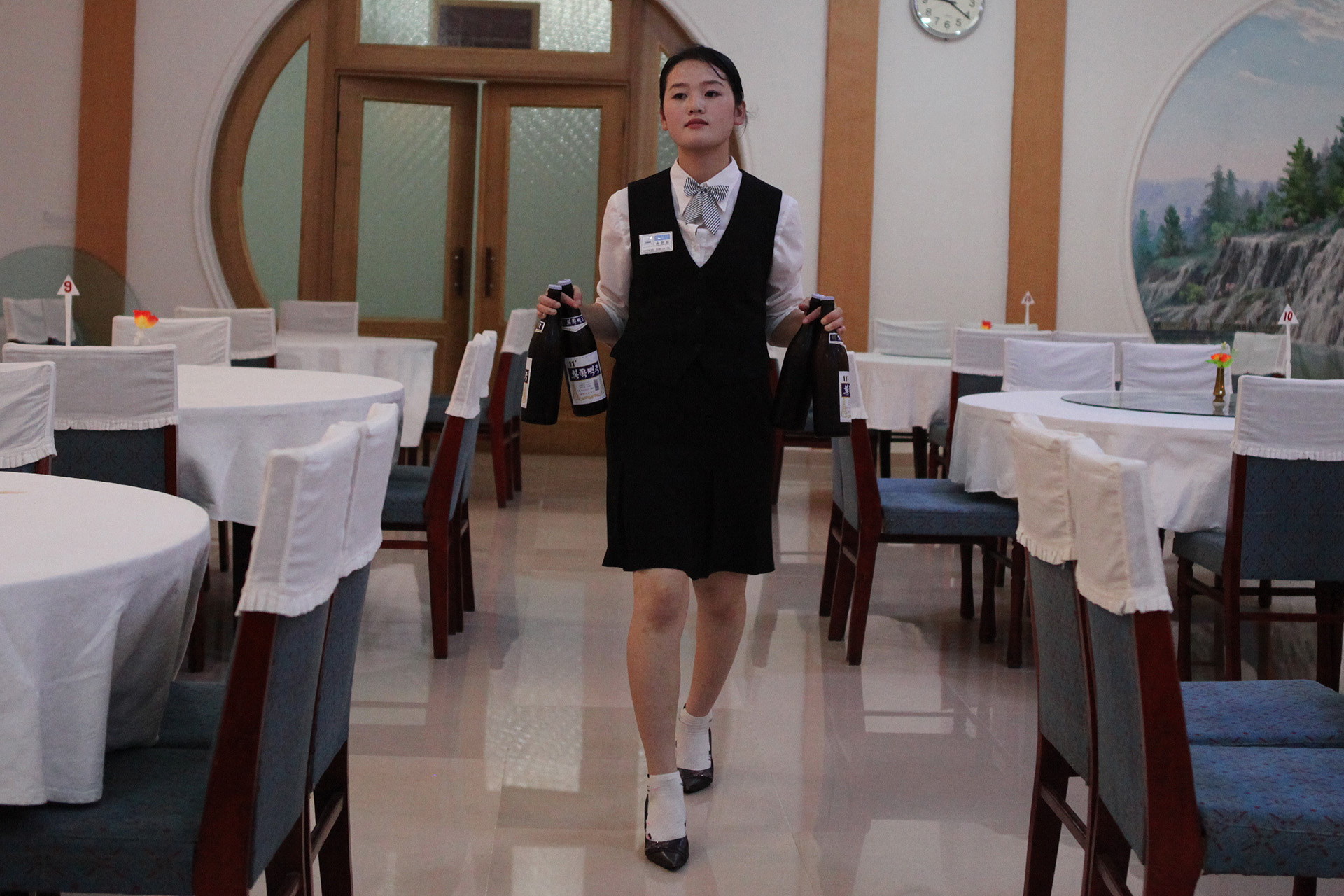
A waitress in a hotel, North Korea

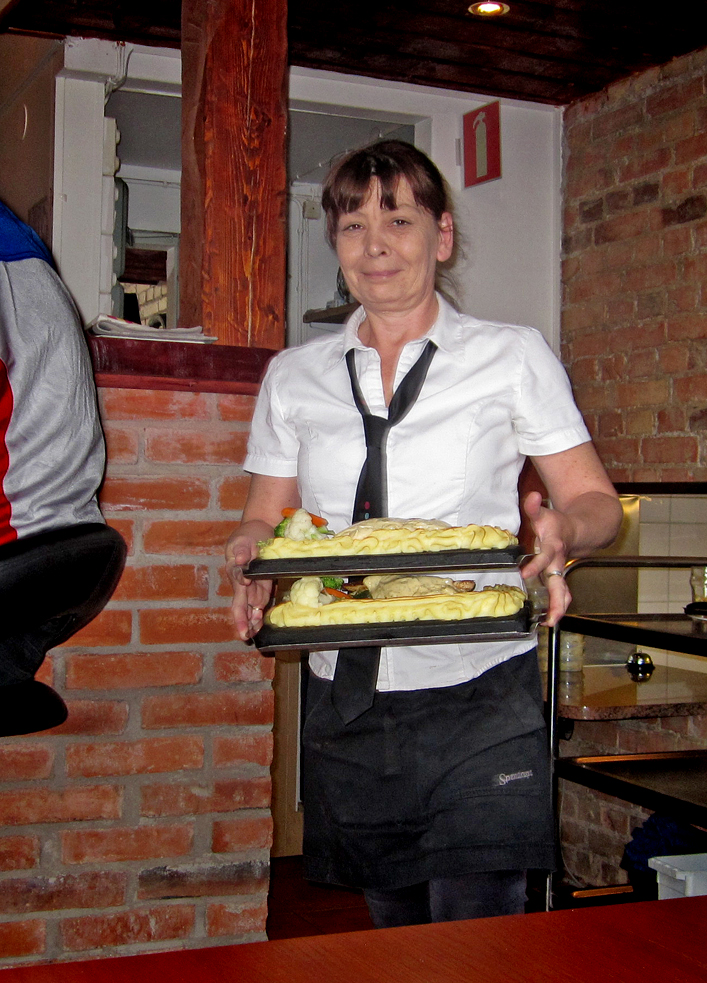
A Swedish waitress, 2012

Waiting staff (BrE), waiters (masc/neutr) / waitresses (fem), or servers (AmE) are those who work at a restaurant, a diner, or a bar and sometimes in private homes, attending to customers by supplying them with food and drink as requested. Waiting staff carry out many different tasks, such as explaining menu options, taking orders, food-running, polishing dishes and silverware, helping bus tables, chatting with patrons, restocking working stations with needed supplies, refillung beverage glasses, handing out the bill, and accepting payment.

Waiting on tables is part of the service sector and among the most common occupations. In the United States, the Bureau of Labor Statistics estimated that, as of May 2023, there were about 2.2 million people employed as servers in the country.

Many restaurants have a uniform or dress code for their waiting staff. Waiting staff may receive tips as a minor or major part of their earnings, with customs varying widely from country to country.

== Terminology ==
An individual waiting tables (or waiting on or waiting at tables) or waitering or waitressing is commonly called a waiter, server, front server, waitress, Chef de Rang (for fine dining), member of the wait staff, waitstaff, serving staff server, waitperson, or waitron. The last two terms are gender neutral but rarely used, and the terms waiter and server are increasingly used for women too. Archaic terms such as serving girl, serving wench, or serving lad are generally used only within their historical context, and are generally seen as rude in the modern vocabulary.

== Roles ==
In large luxury establishments, there are often multiple ranks of waiting staff in the dining room:

- Maître d'hôtel (fine dining), responsible for dining room as a whole, greets guests; sometimes acts as headwaiter and/or supervisor
  - Chef de Rang (fine dining), (Captain/Head Waiter): Achieved after several years of experience in fine dining, responsible for managing a specific section or station (known as a rang) of the dining room
  - Demi-Chef de Rang (fine dining), (Junior Captain): A transitional role with more guest interaction work under the Chef de Rang.
  - Commis de Rang (fine dining), (Busser/Back-waiter): An entry-level role in fine dining directly assigned to assisting the Chef de Rang.
  - Floor manager
    - Expeditor, or "Expo", responsible for ensuring accuracy and completeness of orders. The expeditor is also often responsible for preparing the tray for the servers so they can bring all of the plates of that course to all of the table guests at the same time
    - Captain, responsible for several tables
      - Waiter: this includes a Front waiter and a Back waiter, who helps waiters refill water, replenish bread, etc.
- Bar back, who helps a bartender by bussing, and restocking glassware and alcohol
- Cocktail waitress
- Runner, who brings cooked dishes to diners
- Bevertainer, a cocktail waiter or waitress who also works as a singer and dancer
- Busser, busboy, clears tables, sets tables

In restaurants, the captain is typically responsible for interacting with the diners and overseeing waiters.

There are also waiting staff specialists, notably a sommelier for wine service, and occasionally a maître fromager for the cheese service. A host or hostess may be responsible for seating diners if there is not a maître d'hôtel.

== Duties ==
Saganaki, lit on fire, served by Chefs de Rang or Demi-Chefs de Rang in Chicago

Two waitresses awaiting guests in a dining room, early 20th century

Such duties of typical waiters include the following: preparing a section of tables before guests sit down (e.g., changing the tablecloth, putting out new utensils, cleaning chairs, etc.), although typically this is a responsibility of bussers; offering cocktails, specialty drinks, wine, beer, or other beverages; recommending food options; requesting the chef to make changes in how food is prepared; pre-clearing the tables; and serving food and beverages to customers. In some higher-end restaurants, servers have a good knowledge of the wine list and can recommend food–wine pairings. At more expensive restaurants, servers memorize the ingredients of the dishes and the manner in which the food is prepared; for example, if the menu lists marinated beef, the customer might ask what the beef is marinated in, for how long, and what cut of beef is used in the dish. Silver service staff are specially trained to serve at banquets or high-end restaurants. These servers follow specific rules and service guidelines, which makes this a skilled job. They generally wear black and white with a long, white apron (extending from the waist to the ankles).

The head server is in charge of the waiting staff and is also frequently responsible for assigning seating. The head server must insure that all staff do their duties accordingly. The functions of a head server can overlap to some degree with that of the maître d'hôtel. Restaurants in North America employ an additional level of waiting staff, known as busboys or busgirls, increasingly referred to as bussers or server assistants, to clear dirty dishes, set tables, and otherwise assist the waiting staff.

Some waitstaff keep or consult blacklists of rude customers.

== Working conditions ==
Emotional labour is often required of waiting staff, insofar as they must smile and use "surface acting" to display the "correct" emotion when interacting with customers. If a waiting staff member is faced with an angry customer, they cannot appear angry even if they feel angry. As well, some waiting staff face "sexual innuendo, suggestive jokes, [and] unwanted bodily contact" from customers, which servers are expected to "manag[e] and contro[l] without revealing the waitress's true feelings."

== Requirements ==
Restaurant serving positions require on-the-job training that would be held by an upper-level server in the restaurant. The server will be trained to provide good customer service, learn food items and drinks, and maintain a neat and tidy appearance. Working in a role such as captain in a top rated restaurant requires disciplined role-playing comparable to a theater performance.

In the United States, some states require individuals employed to handle food and beverages to obtain a food handler's card or permit. In those states, servers that do not have a permit or handler's card can not serve. The server can achieve a permit or handler's card online.

No food certification requirements are needed in Canada. However, to serve alcoholic beverages in Canada, servers must undergo their province's online training course within a month of being hired.

== Gratuities ==
Customs vary regionally regarding the payment of gratuities to waitstaff.

In the United States, a tip paid in addition to the amount presented on the bill for food and drinks is customary. At most sit-down restaurants, servers expect a tip after a patron has paid the check. The minimum legally-required hourly wage paid to waiters and waitresses in many U.S. states is lower than the minimum wage employers are required to pay for most other forms of labor to account for the tips, which form a significant portion of the server's income. If wages and tips do not equal the federal minimum wage of $7.25 per hour during any week, the employer is required to increase cash wages to compensate for the difference.

== See also ==
- Brigade de cuisine, about organization of kitchen staff
- Chamberlain (office)
- Hospitality
- Soda jerk
- Table service
- Waiters' Race
- Flight attendant
