= Bia ôm =

Bia ôm (lit. 'beer hug') is a type of drinking establishment in Vietnam where patrons consume beer while being served by hostesses, often involving physical contact such as hugging, caressing, or other intimate interactions. These venues are commonly associated with prostitution and are not legally recognized in Vietnam, leading to clandestine operations disguised as legitimate businesses like karaoke rooms or restaurants. It has become prevalent in urban areas, particularly large cities like Ho Chi Minh City, and is often viewed as a social issue.

== History ==
The concept of bia ôm has existed for some time but saw significant growth following Vietnam's Đổi Mới economic reforms in the late 1980s, which opened up the economy and led to increased urbanization and social changes. During this period, such establishments proliferated in response to demand for entertainment and companionship in drinking settings, especially in bustling cities like Saigon where they operate primarily at night, peaking around 10 PM.

== Forms and operations ==
Bia ôm venues vary in format but typically involve female hostesses (often referred to as "beer girls," "đào," "tay vịn," or "chân dài") who serve drinks, engage in conversation, and provide physical affection to male patrons. These establishments often appear deserted from the outside but transform into vibrant, hedonistic spaces inside, with operations centered around karaoke sessions in private rooms. Hostesses, dressed provocatively in revealing clothing or thin garments sometimes without underwear, sit closely with customers, sing, and encourage beer consumption to maximize revenue, as beer sales (priced around 60,000 VND per can) are the primary income source. Common variations include:

- Standard bia ôm: Hostesses sit with customers, pouring drinks and allowing physical contact.
- Karaoke ôm: Combined with karaoke singing, where interactions occur in private rooms.
- Hotline services: Hostesses available via phone for off-site meetings.
- Striptease bia ôm: More explicit forms involving partial or full nudity.

Rooms typically offer minimal food like dry snacks and fruit plates, emphasizing drinking over eating. Hostesses often use slang terms to communicate discreetly, such as "đi du lịch" (go traveling) for sexual intercourse or "bắt cua bắt ốc" (catching crabs and snails) for fondling. Prices for drinks and services are typically inflated and not listed on menus, with hostesses earning commissions, tips, and additional fees from allowing physical contact or arranging encounters, ranging from a few million VND. Staff, including hostesses, often lack formal labor contracts and wages, relying entirely on customer gratuities. Many hostesses come from economically disadvantaged backgrounds, with low education levels, and enter the profession due to limited job opportunities. Patrons are primarily men seeking to satisfy desires for physical intimacy in a social drinking environment, including foreigners, with hostesses competing to retain customers amid nearby similar venues.

== Legal status ==
Bia ôm is not legally permitted in Vietnam and is often linked to prostitution, which is illegal. Authorities frequently conduct raids, involving joint operations by police units like Ho Chi Minh City's PC64, mobile forces, and cultural-social departments, using deceptive tactics to avoid detection. For instance, cases have involved managers accused of facilitating prostitution for fees ranging from millions of Vietnamese dong. Despite penalties such as license revocations, businesses persist through sophisticated countermeasures, including security guards for alerts, narrow stairways, electronic entry cards, hidden escape routes, and alarm systems that prompt hostesses to flee via secret paths. High profits and insufficient administrative deterrence allow violations to continue, with owners often re-registering under proxies after sanctions. Specific incidents from raids show hostesses scattering to evade capture or photographers, and rooms containing only beer cans and fruit as evidence. The practice raises social concerns, including exploitation of women in unregulated, high-risk activities, health risks, and family disruptions, as evidenced by personal accounts of spouses discovering partners' involvement. It has also been referenced in cultural contexts, such as riddles or media discussions highlighting its societal impact.

== See also ==
- Prostitution in Vietnam
- Drinking culture
- Host and hostess clubs
