= Patpong Museum =

Private museum dedicated to the history of Bangkok's Patpong red-light district

Coordinates: 13.728736°N 100.532163°E

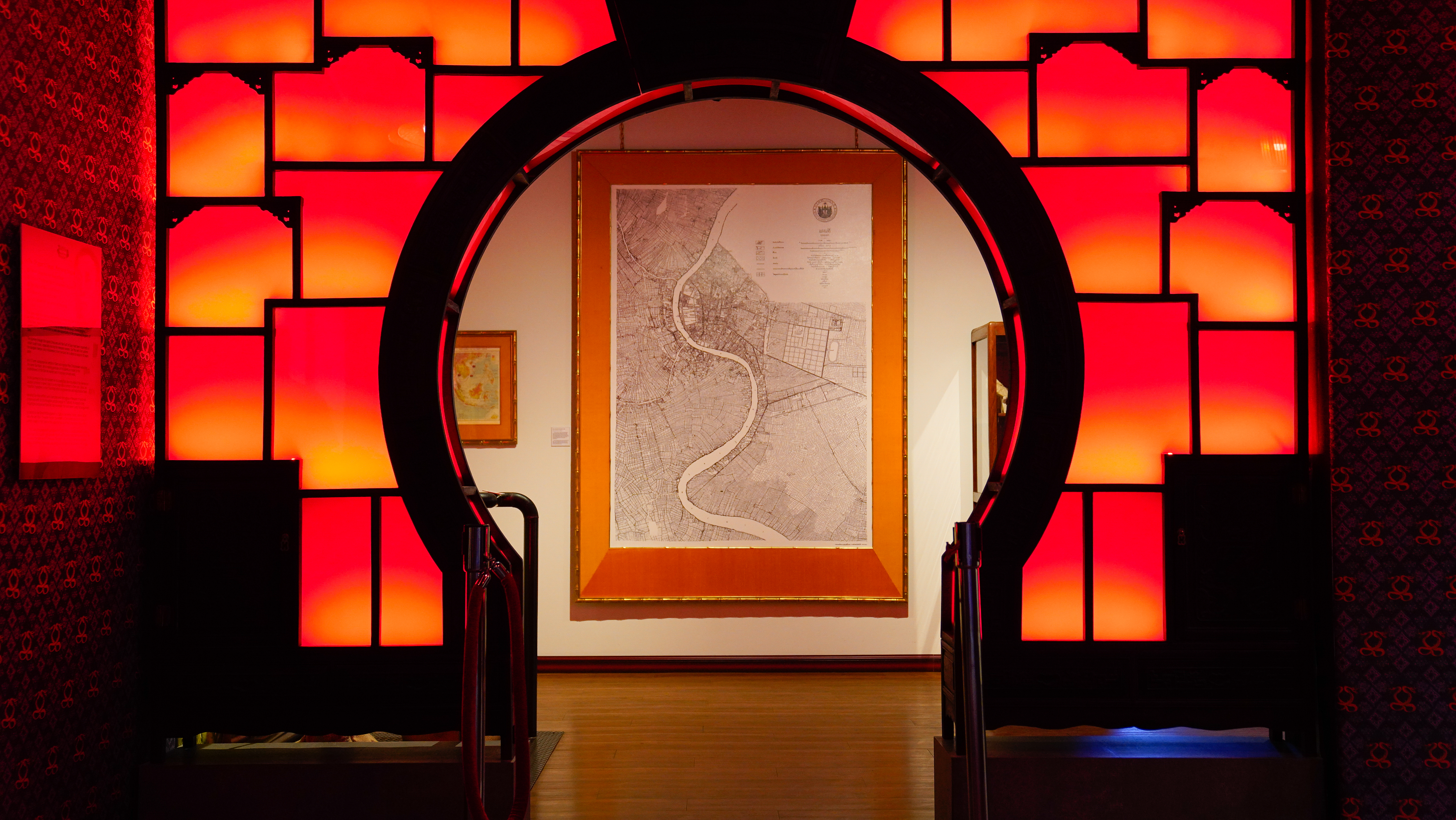
- Museum entrance
- Established: October 2019
- Dissolved: May 18, 2023
- Location: 5 Soi Patpong 2, Suriyawong subdistrict, Bang Rak district, Bangkok, Thailand

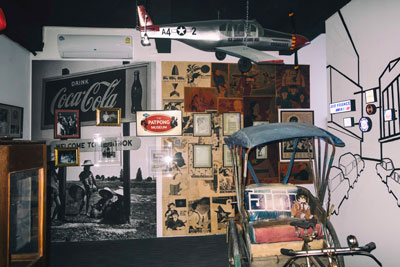
Interior of the Patpong Museum

The Patpong Museum was a museum in Bangkok, Thailand. Opened in 2019 in Patpong Soi 2, its collection includes interactive exhibitions, artifacts, and recreated spaces covering Patpong's history from its 1946 purchase by the Luang Patpongpanich and subsequent development. The presence of the CIA in Patpong through its secret airlines such as "Civil Air Transport" and "Air America" is highlighted and brings the cold war, the Vietnam war and the secret war in Laos into the context of Patpong.

The second part of the exhibition was dedicated to Patpongs further development into one of the world's most famous entertainment areas and eventually red light districts. Superstars like David Bowie, Robert De Niro, Jean-Claude Van Damme and Christopher Walken visit and film in Patpong marking its presence in popular culture.

The privately owned museum was located on the 2nd floor of building 5, below Black Pagoda, and was open daily.

On 18 May 2023, the museum announced the cessation of its operations through a statement published on its official Facebook page.
