= Luang Patpongpanich =

- พัฒน์พงศ์พานิช
- Born: 1881; Hainan, Qing
- Died: 1950 (aged 68–69)
- Children: Udom Patpongpanich

Luang Patpongpanich (Thai: หลวงพัฒน์พงศ์พานิช, RTGS: luang phatphong phanit), known in Chinese as Tun Poon, was a Thai-Chinese businessman and namesake of the Patpong District in Bangkok, Thailand. Born in Hainan during the Qing Dynasty in 1881, Patpongpanich emigrated to then-Siam in 1891. He changed his name to Poon Pat in 1900, and married a Thai woman.

In 1927, he was awarded the title of Luang with and the last name Patpongpanich by King Rama VII for his services.

In 1946, the Patpong area was sold to Patpongpanich for 60,000 Baht. Formerly a banana plantation, the area was developed by Patpongpanich's oldest son, Udom.

== Legacy ==
The Patpong area remains under the ownership of the Patpongpanich family. Luang's family history was displayed in the Patpong Museum.
