= Cocktail waitress =

Female servers in bars

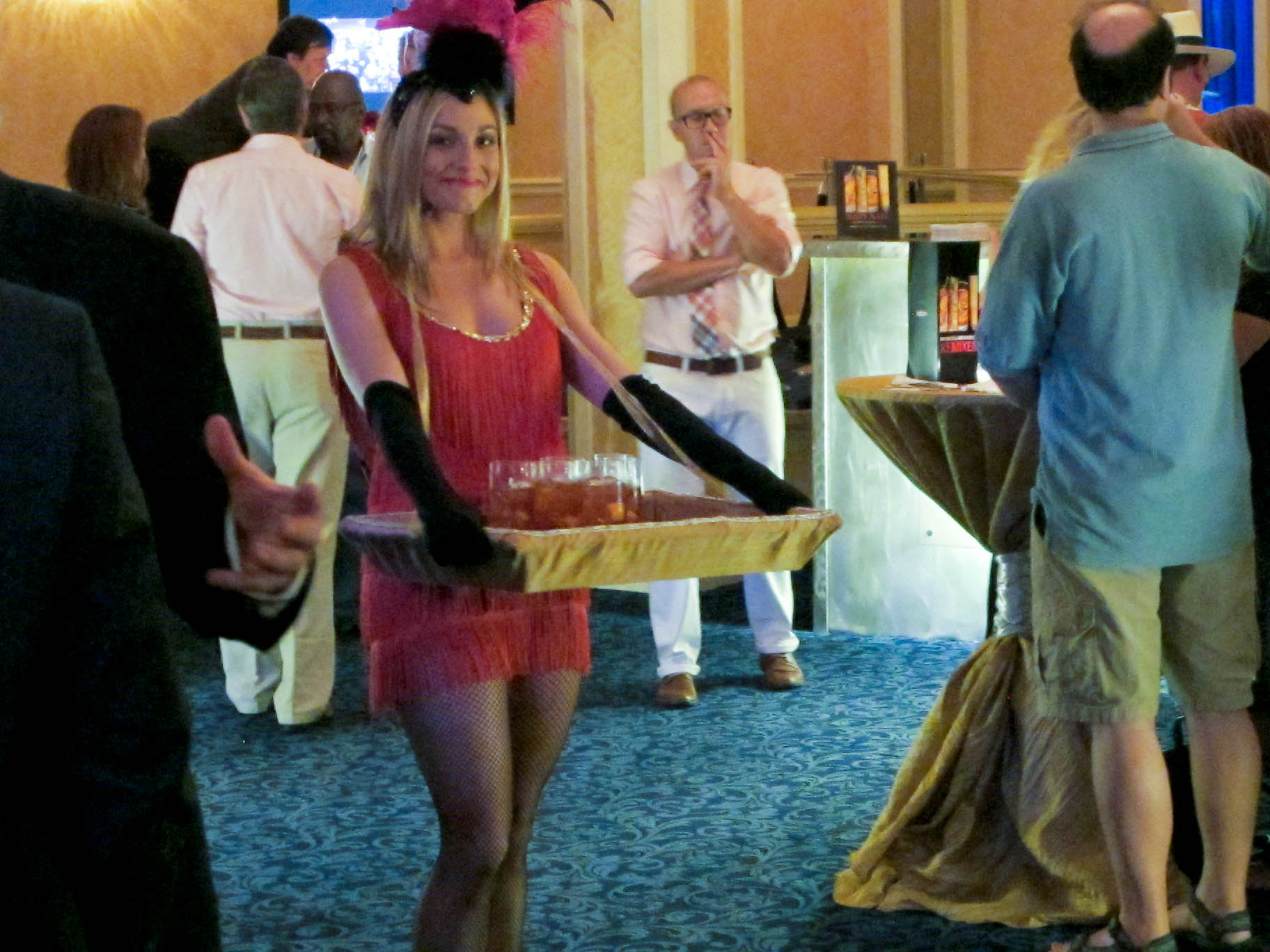
A costumed cocktail waitress serving drinks

A cocktail waitress, colloquially known as a bottle girl, is a female server who brings alcoholic drinks to patrons of drinking establishments such as bars, cocktail lounges, casinos, comedy clubs, jazz clubs, cabarets, and other live music venues. The unisex job title is cocktail server.

Many cocktail waitresses also entertain customers and some require booking. They may hold up customized signs.

Casinos traditionally dress their cocktail waitresses in fancy outfits with very short skirts and pantyhose or fishnet stockings, while less flashy establishments may require waitstaff attire. Playboy Bunnies are a famous example of the profession. In the United States, cocktail waitresses are common in casino towns like Atlantic City, Las Vegas, and Reno. It is customary in the United States to tip the cocktail waitress for serving drinks, even in casinos which offer free drinks to active gamblers.

Training is normally done on the job, usually for less than a month. While they need to have general information about alcoholic drinks (e.g., to recognize the names of different kinds of liquor), they also need to learn the specifics of the particular establishment (e.g., the particular brands available at the moment).

Nearly all the time at work is spent standing or walking, often while carrying drinks (considered light or sometimes medium lifting).

== See also ==
- Bevertainer
