= Go-go bar =

Type of nightclub

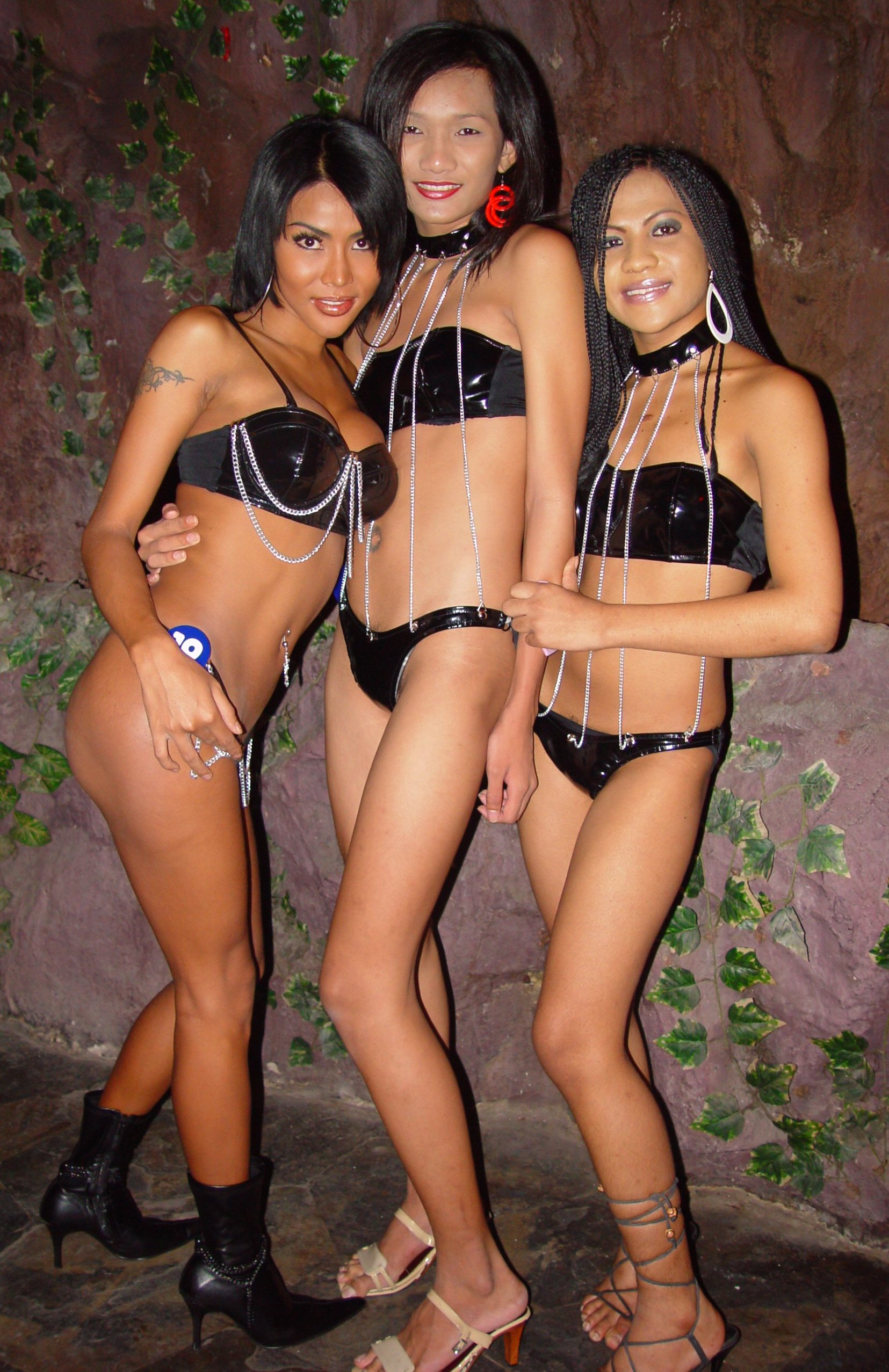
Kathoey working in a go-go bar in Bangkok's Nana Plaza entertainment neighborhood

A go-go bar is a type of business establishment where alcoholic drinks are sold and dancers provide entertainment. The term go-go bar originally referred to a nightclub, bar, or similar establishment that featured go-go dancers; while some go-go bars in that original sense still exist, the link between its present uses and that original meaning is often more tenuous and regional. Speaking broadly, the term has been used by venues that cover a wide range of businesses, from nightclubs or discotheques, where dancers are essentially there to set the mood, to what are in essence burlesque theaters or strip clubs, where dancers are part of a show and the primary focus.

== Etymology ==
The origin of the term go-go dancing goes back to a 1949 British film Whisky Galore!. This film tells the story of the sinking of a ship loaded with whiskey. The French title of this film was Whisky à gogo !, "à gogo" being Parisian slang for "galore". During the period that this film was showing in France, discotheques were just introduced as a new form of entertainment. Due to the success of the film and the snob appeal of drinking whiskey in France, a number of discotheques were given the name "Whiskey à Go-Go".

The first Whisky à Gogo nightclub opened in Paris in 1947, drawing the "Whisky" part of its name from the whisky labels that lined its walls. In 1953 it became the first discotheque. The club was franchised, first in Chicago in 1958 and then in Los Angeles in 1964. In May 1964, the Los Angeles club was featured in Life magazine. By 1965, clubs called Whisky à Go-Go (or Whiskey à Go-Go) had appeared in Milwaukee, Washington, San Francisco and Atlanta. In the Los Angeles club a new style of dance was taking place, as go-go dancers in short, fringed skirts and high boots danced in a glass booth above the patrons. The first recorded occurrence of topless go-go dancing was in the Condor nightclub in San Francisco in 1964, and topless go-go dancing quickly became a part of the adult entertainment industry.

During this time, several dance styles were becoming popular in which dancers danced separately from their partner or with no partner at all. American discos, often using the same name (“Whiskey A Go-Go”) as their French predecessor, introduced young women dancing alone in these new styles as a form of entertainment, creating the concept of a "go-go dancer".

== United States ==
The term go-go bar is often used for certain sorts of strip clubs. In regions where the term is used, go-go bars are considered lower in class when compared to gentlemen's clubs, which offer a more coordinated and show-centric experience. In these bars:

- There is no champagne court.
- Dress codes are more relaxed for both patrons and performers.
- There are no staging, choreography, or special effects considerations.
- A House Mother monitors activity and assists performers in the dressing area.
- Feature performers usually do not perform at go-go bars.

== East and Southeast Asia ==
The phrase go-go was adopted by bars in the 1960s in Tokyo, Japan. It gained a lesser reputation when it was abandoned by a majority of clubs and appropriated by bawdy burlesque and striptease establishments, which in turn became known as go-go bars and the women working there known as go-go dancers.

During the Vietnam War the United States Seventh Fleet was based at the U.S. Naval Base Subic Bay in the city of Olongapo in the Philippines. The city had 500 go-go bars used by US servicemen. There were also many go-go bars in Saigon, South Vietnam, to entertain U.S. troops. A synonym used in Vietnam for go-go dancing is "table dancing".

There were many such bars in Thailand during the Vietnam War and they continued (on a smaller scale) after the war ended in 1975. During the 1980s, Thailand became a leading center for sex tourism with go-go bars located in the red light districts catering to foreigners. They are part of Thailand's sex-related entertainment industry, along with massage parlors. Go-go bars have hostesses and/or dancers who perform on stage, sometimes pole dancing. They typically dance wearing bikinis, lingerie or fetish costumes. Occasionally they perform topless but rarely nude and the bars do not usually offer striptease, although sex shows are sometimes performed on stage. Many of the bars are found in Bangkok in Patpong, Nana Plaza, and Soi Cowboy. Unlike Thailand's many open-fronted bars, go-go bars are not accessed directly from the street. Instead they are indoor bars located in closed buildings. The participants are not visible from the outside so that passers-by cannot congregate to view the dancers for free. Dancing is typically used as a form of solicitation for prostitution. After dancing for the customers, the bar girls who work there often leave with them to provide sexual services once the customers have paid a bar fine.

"Go-go boys" (male dancers) have performed in Bangkok's gay bars since the 1970s, performing erotic dances on stages or platforms – and sometimes also pole dancing – to advertise their availability for sexual services. They usually dress in underwear briefs displaying an identifying number, which patrons can use to identify a dancer to the bar manager so that a drink together can be arranged. Since the 1990s, some dancers have performed naked. Soi Twilight is Bangkok's main street for gay go-go bars.

Go-go bars can also be found in parts of the Philippines and other parts of Southeast Asia.

== See also ==
- Bargirl
