= Soi Cowboy =

Street in Bangkok, Thailand

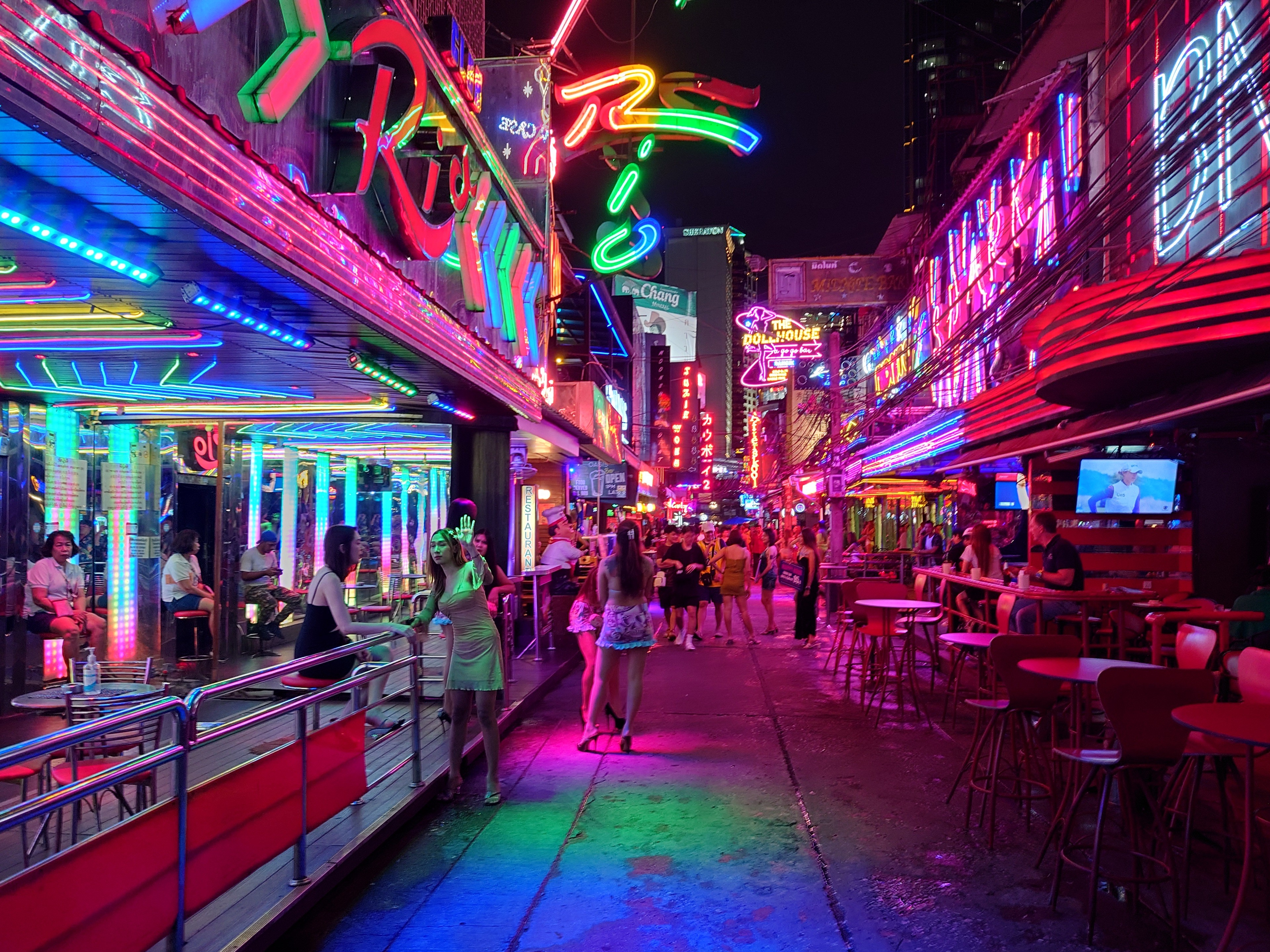
- Soi Cowboy at night in 2023
- Interactive map of Soi Cowboy
- Length: 150 m (490 ft)
- Location: Khlong Toei Nuea, Watthana district, Bangkok, Thailand
- Coordinates: 13°44′12.5″N 100°33′45″E
- West end: Asok Montri road
- East end: Soi Sukhumvit 23

Other
- Known for: Red-light district

Soi Cowboy (Thai: ซอยคาวบอย, RTGS: Soi Khaoboi, pronounced [sɔ̄ːj kʰāːw.bɔ̄ːj]) is a short street (soi) in Bangkok, Thailand. It is 150 metres (160 yards) long and is the location of around 40 commercial establishments, mostly go-go bars. It caters mainly to tourists and expatriates. Soi Cowboy contains one of the three largest groups of foreign-oriented bars in Bangkok, the other two being Patpong and Soi Nana Tai.

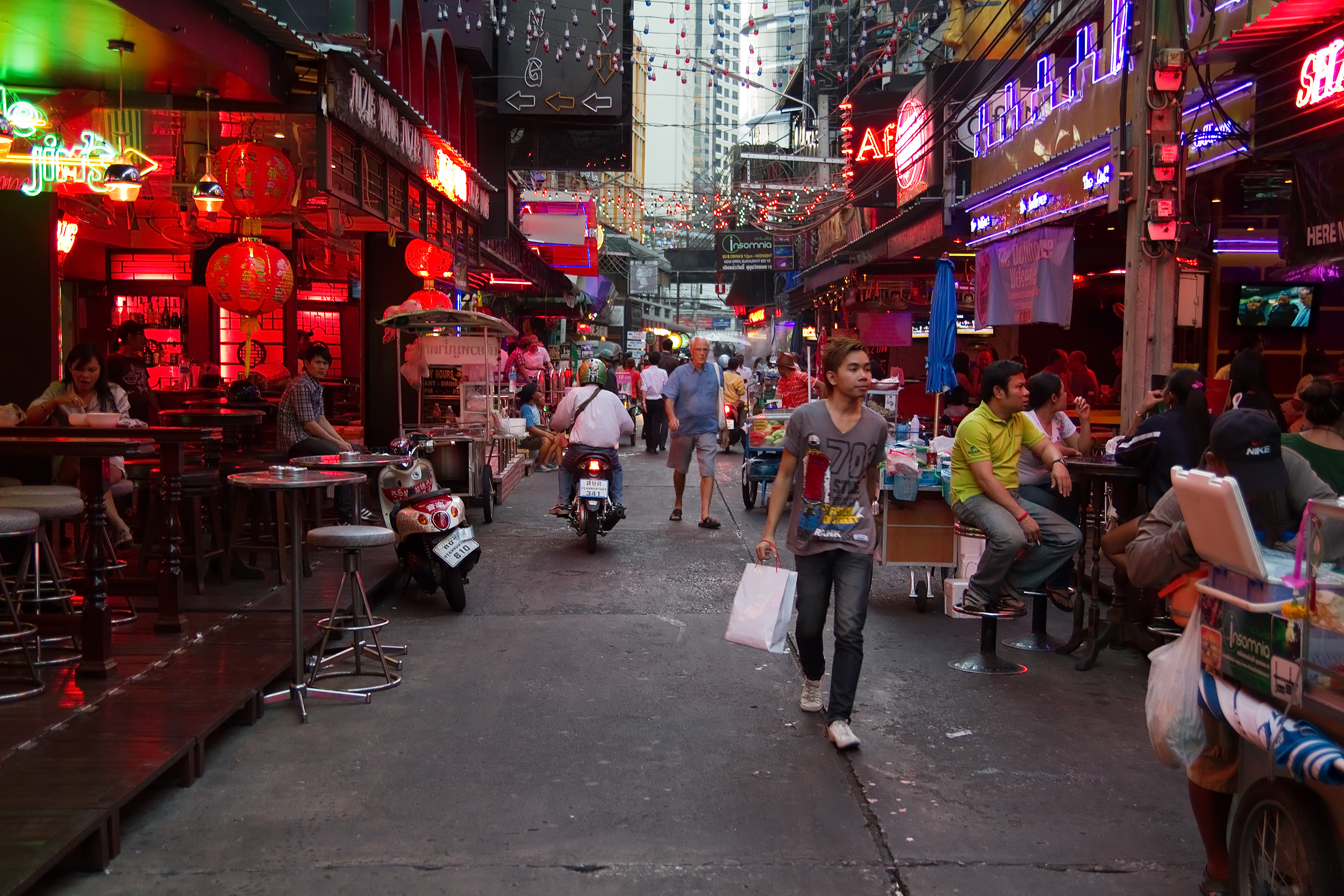
Soi Cowboy at dusk

== Location ==
Soi Cowboy is near Sukhumvit Road, between Asok Montri Road (Soi Sukhumvit 21) and Soi Sukhumvit 23, within walking distance from the BTS Skytrain's Asok Station and the Bangkok MRT's Sukhumvit Station. The Pullman Bangkok Grande Sukhumvit Hotel is nearby.

== History ==
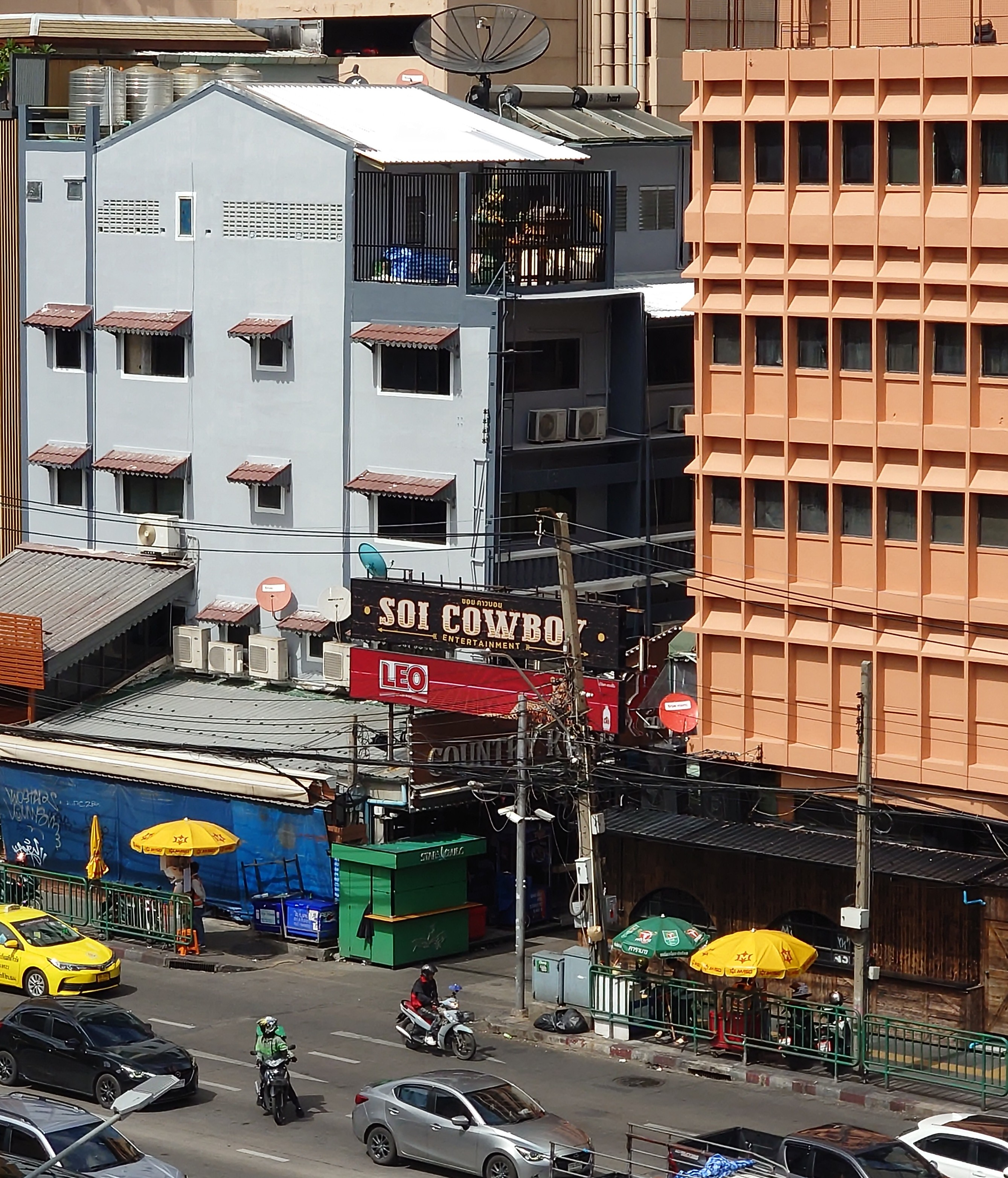
Soi Cowboy entrance on the side of Soi Sukhumvit 21

The first bar opened in Soi Cowboy in the early 1970s, but it was not until 1977 that a second bar opened on the street by T. G. "Cowboy" Edwards, a retired American airman. Edwards got his nickname because he often wore a cowboy hat and the soi was given its name in reference to him by longtime nightlife columnist Bernard Trink. The number of bars grew to 31 by the end of the century, all located on the ground floor.

== In popular culture ==
Some scenes from the 2004 film Bridget Jones: The Edge of Reason were both shot in Soi Cowboy and set there. In the film the actor Hugh Grant plays a character who visits a Soi Cowboy massage parlour.

In August 2006, scenes were shot in Soi Cowboy for the film Bangkok Dangerous.
