= Bargirl =

Female worker in bars and brothels

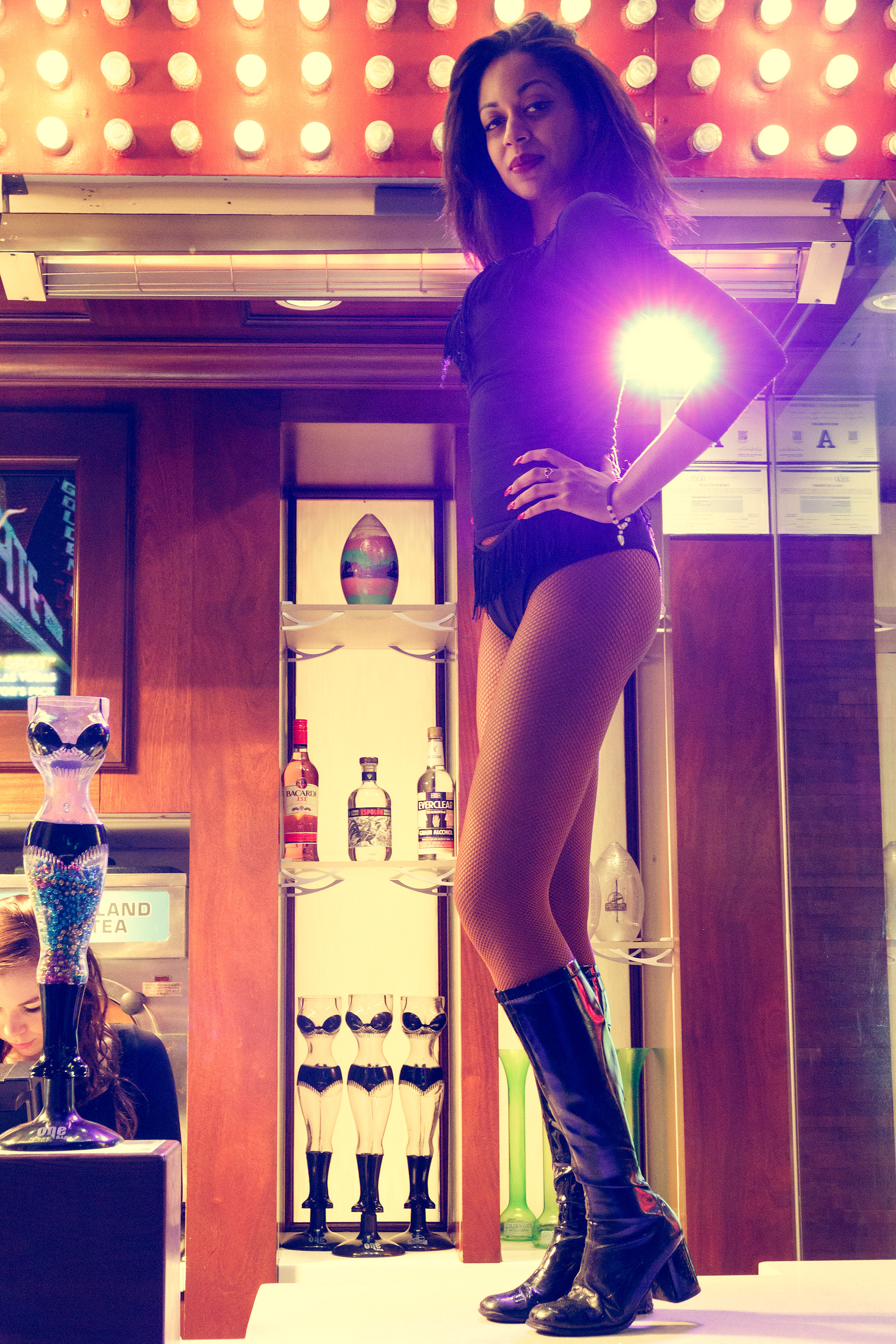
A bar girl in Las Vegas

A bargirl is a woman who is paid to entertain patrons in a bar or nightclub. Variants on the term include "B-girl" and "juicy girl". Many bargirls work as a bar hostess, engaging individual customers in conversation. They may also provide them with sexual entertainment such as a lap dance, or offer to sell them sexual services. Some bargirls work as a bar dancer providing more public entertainment, often in the form of an erotic dance, go-go dance or striptease. The exact nature of the entertainment varies widely from place to place, depending on the venue.

Bargirls work in various types of bars throughout the world, including strip clubs and regular bars in the U.S., hostess bars in East Asia, go-go bars and "beer bars" in Southeast Asia, dance bars in India, and boliches in Argentina.

A bar fine is a payment made by a customer to the operators of a bar or nightclub in East and South East Asia that allows a bar girl to leave work early, usually in order to accompany a customer outside for sexual services.

== Methods of payment ==
Bargirls often receive a commission on drinks bought by their customers, either a percentage or a fixed amount added to the drink's price. This is frequently a bargirl's main source of income, but other sources of income can include a salary, tips (often the main source of earnings), and a percentage of any bar fine. They may also be given a periodic quota of drinks. Salaries may be increased for bargirls who have more sexual encounters, as they are thought to attract more customers to the bar. Deductions are sometimes made from earnings if the bar provides food and accommodation for the bargirl.

Alcohol has been used as a currency for transactional sex in South Africa and Uganda.

== Bargirl prostitution in Africa ==
In Ethiopia in the 1970s, bargirls were common in drinking establishments. Those working in the larger bars were provided with board and lodging and a small salary, in return for their work attracting, serving and entertaining customers. Typically they also provided sexual services to their customers, the terms for which were negotiated separately with the customers. Some bargirls had many sexual encounters, while other restricted their sexual services for specific men.

John M. Chernoff's 2003 book Hustling Is Not Stealing: Stories of an African Bar Girl recorded the experiences of a bar girl in West Africa in the 1970s. It was awarded the 2004 Victor Turner Prize in Ethnographic Writing.

Research was carried out in the 1990s into sex work carried out by bar girls in Malawi, where the terms bar girl and prostitute were synonymous. Bar girls were officially employed to serve drinks and clean the bar, but the wages paid for their bar work were low, often lower than the statutory minimum wage, and these were sometimes not paid at all. To supplement their income, most bar girls engaged in commercial sex with the co-operation of the bar owners, who regarded this as an additional means of attracting customers. The bars usually provided the bar girls with rent-free single-room accommodation, which served as a venue for sexual encounters with clients. The bar patrons were typically men unaccompanied by wives or girlfriends. They were mostly in salaried employment, for example as international hauliers. Although prostitution in Malawi is illegal, police action was mostly taken against street prostitutes rather than bar girls, as the latter were not considered to be soliciting. Most bar girls, frequently in desperate need for money, engaged in survival sex out of economic necessity. This was a major reason for their persisting in sex work. Screening carried out at the time indicated that about 80 per cent of bargirls carried the HIV virus.

== Bargirl prostitution in Asia ==
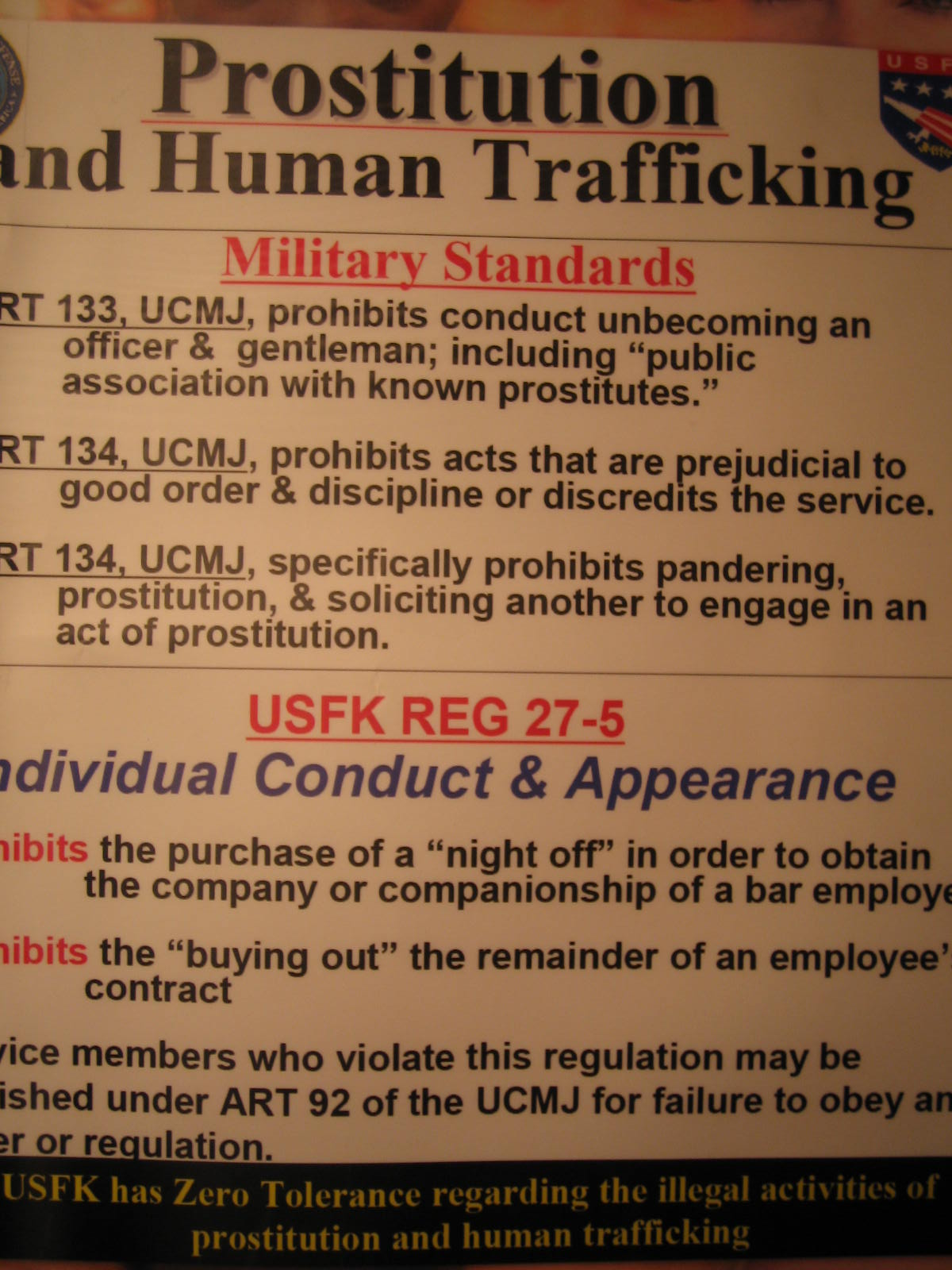
A United States Forces Korea poster, warning soldiers not to engage in prostitution or purchase a "bar fine", here referred to as a "night off"

In the popular cultures of East Asia in the twentieth century, the bar girl and teahouse girl became archetypical characters associated with prostitution, replacing the traditional courtesan in that role. Working conditions for prostitutes vary both among and within countries in Asia. Even within individual countries, conditions can vary widely between venues.

=== China ===
Prostitution in China was eliminated during the period of Mao Zedong's leadership, but it subsequently returned. In the 21st century there are nightclubs where bargirls earn tips and solicit for prostitution.

=== Japan ===
In postwar Japan, bar girls were to be found in the jazz clubs which provided a place for US servicemen and prostitutes to meet.

In Japan an "entertainers visa" was introduced in 1981 allowing migrant Filipina women to work in Japanese nightclubs. The work included dancing in strip shows, socialising with male guests, and in some cases prostitution.

=== Philippines ===
Bikini bar girls in the Philippines dance on elevated platforms wearing skimpy bikinis or two-piece see-through garments. They work in bikini bars which are a part of the country's sex industry. In the go-go bars of Angeles City in the Philippines, the bar dancers typically work as prostitutes and leave with customers after the payment of a bar fine. In the Philippines, the role of bar girl has become stereotyped and stigmatised due to its association with prostitution and the US military.

=== South Korea ===
It is a common practice in South Korea for bargirls to also act as prostitutes, either on-site (with the bar effectively acting as a brothel) or by being hired upon payment of a bar fine. "Juicy bars" near the gates of United States military bases provide prostitutes for US soldiers in South Korea. Prostitution has been illegal in South Korea since 2004, and since 2005 the Uniform Code of Military Justice has prohibited US military personnel from buying the services of prostitutes, with bars and clubs suspected of being venues for prostitution being declared "off-limits" for military personnel.

=== Thailand ===
In Thailand, it is go-go bars rather than beer bars that are the venues for on-stage bar dancing. Bar dancers in go-go bars typically wear bikinis, lingerie or fetish costumes, though they may perform topless or occasionally nude. They sometimes perform pole dances or take part in sex shows or trick shows such as the ping pong show. Bar dancing in Thailand is sometimes used to solicit for prostitution. In countries such as Thailand, where bargirl prostitution is common, it is technically illegal but widely tolerated. Some bargirls in Thailand are employed by a bar but most are self-employed, deriving their income from dancing, persuading bar customers to buy drinks, and prostitution. Where bargirls work as prostitutes, they may take multiple "short time" clients or accept "long-time" clients overnight or for a few days. The most successful bargirls become entrepreneurs, in some cases travelling abroad with their foreign boyfriends.

A "bar fine" is a payment made by a customer to the operators of a bar that allows a dancer, hostess, or some other employee of that bar to leave work early, usually in order to accompany the customer outside the bar. The bar fine is usually kept by the bar in lieu of lost income, but in some larger bar chains the bargirl may receive a portion of the bar fine, with much of the remainder being used to pay for STD and HIV testing for the bargirls. The portion of the bar fine paid to the bargirl is often around half, though this may be less if the bar supports its bargirls by providing them with food and accommodation. Although not universal, bar fines are frequently associated with venues offering prostitution to foreigners.

The majority of the women who work in Thailand's go-go bars and beer bars (outdoor hostess bars) are economic migrants. They mostly come from the poorest areas of the country, Northern Thailand and Northeast Thailand. Bar work allows them to earn many times what they could earn farming. Many work as bargirls for a few years to help their families, allowing them to pay off their debts and improve their living conditions. Some beer bars employ bargirls on a salaried basis while others employ them on a freelance basis, with there are some beer bars that do both. Some salaried bargirls also work as bar waitresses. There is significant variation in working conditions among establishments in Thailand's red-light district in Pattaya. Some bars employ relatively well-paid women who live outside the bar, while others employ lower-paid women who live at the bar.

=== Vietnam ===
During the Vietnam War, a system of military-endorsed prostitution allowed bar girls to provide sexual services to US servicemen. Vietnamese bar girls wore western clothes, unlike most Vietnamese at the time. The bars were mostly located in central Saigon and near US military facilities. The customers in the bars were almost exclusively American. Each bar had typically between five and twenty bar girls whose job it was to converse with the Americans and persuade them to buy drinks. The total number of bar girls involved amounted to several hundred thousand. They typically lived in houses or apartments that they shared with each other.

== B-girls in the United States ==
In the United States, B-girls (an abbreviation of bar girls) were women who were paid to converse with male patrons and encourage them to buy them both drinks. The drinks were often watered down or non-alcoholic to minimize the effects of the alcohol on the B-girls and reduce the cost to the bar. B-girls originated in nightclubs and were employed by bars in the US during the 1940s and 1950s. They were scantily clad and often worked as female escorts rather than performers. In her memoirs, Maya Angelou describes working as a B-girl in a San Francisco strip club in the 1950s.

B-girl activity has declined in the U.S. (Note: B-girl activity in the U.S. has declined so much that female breakdancers now refer to themselves as B-girls.) but it still occurs. Because prostitution is illegal in most parts of the U.S. and is restricted to licensed brothels in those parts of Nevada where it is legal, B-girls who act as prostitutes are breaking the law. The practice of accepting drinks for pay is specifically outlawed in many localities. Bars have been raided and closed down for "B-girl activity". In one 1962 case, nightclub owners suspected of having ties to a Chicago crime syndicate were brought before the Senate Rackets Committee. The Boston Globe reported that "one of [the syndicate's] rackets, according to testimony, is the operation of cheap nightclubs which use B-girls to solicit watered-down drinks at high prices from customers, or even engage in prostitution with them." It was once common for modestly dressed B-girls to pose as secretaries who had stopped at the bar for a drink on their way home from work. The male customer, under the impression that he had found a "date" for the evening, would buy her one expensive drink after another, only to be jilted afterwards.

A 1984 report by the US Internal Revenue Service described bar girls soliciting for prostitution in bars, hotels and restaurants. The report said that they earned more for sex work than streetwalkers and typically offered more varied services. Bar girls sometimes paid commission to the establishment where they worked. In some cases they used hotel rooms for sex, typically provided by the hotel management or by a client. The report suggested that police attempts to suppress the activity by arresting bar girls had rarely been successful.

In 2014, city officials in Kenner, Louisiana (a suburb of New Orleans), where the practice is illegal, replaced the word "B-girl" with "B-drinker" in their liquor laws to avoid gender discrimination.

Bar girls in strip clubs in the United States often entertain on stage as "exotic dancers", attracting male customers through the use of nudity and suggestive postures. They are not required to have professional training or experience as dancers.

=== In popular culture ===
- Marilyn Monroe was nominated for a Golden Globe award for her role as a B-girl in Bus Stop (1956). In the film, Monroe's character, Chérie, consumes four tea-and-sodas before her companion catches on.
- Darlene, a character in John Kennedy Toole's A Confederacy of Dunces, works as a B-girl in the Night of Joy bar.
- The Robert Coover novel, The Universal Baseball Association, Inc., J. Henry Waugh, Prop., features an encounter with a B-girl.
- In the M*A*S*H season four episode "Deluge", Hawkeye tells Father John Mulcahy: "You look just like a 'B' girl I knew in San Diego". Father Mulcahy jokingly responds that "It's quite possible. I worked my way through divinity school as a 'B' girl in San Diego".
- In the television film Young Indiana Jones and the Treasure of the Peacock's Eye, Indiana Jones (Sean Patrick Flanery) becomes involved with a woman named Lily (Jayne Ashbourne). When they first meet, Lily is working as a bargirl on the island of Java. They meet again, after Lily has had all her money taken from her, been placed on a ship and told to never come back (implying she has been kicked out of town for prostitution).

== See also ==
- Bevertainer
- Breastaurant
- It girl
- Jilt shop
- Meshimori onna
- Prostitution in Thailand
- Table dance
- Taxi dancer
