= Nana BTS station =

BTS skytrain station in Bangkok, Thailand

Nana นานา
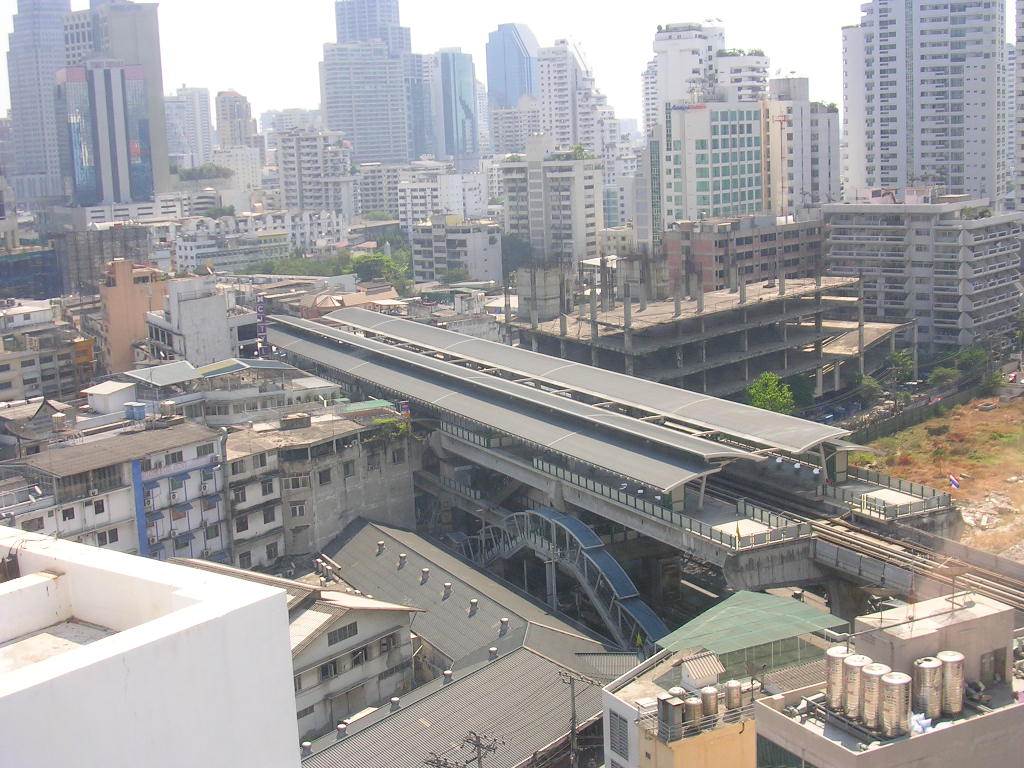
- Nana station

General information
- Location: Khlong Toei and Watthana; Bangkok; Thailand
- Coordinates: 13°44′26.17″N 100°33′19.43″E
- System: BTS
- Owner: Bangkok Metropolitan Administration (BMA); BTS Rail Mass Transit Growth Infrastructure Fund (BTSGIF)
- Operator: Bangkok Mass Transit System; Public Company Limited (BTSC)
- Line: Sukhumvit Line

Other information
- Station code: E3

History
- Opened: 5 December 1999

Passengers
- 2021: 1,149,005

Services
Preceding station	BTS Skytrain	Following station
Phloen Chit towards Khu Khot	Sukhumvit Line	Asok towards Kheha
Location

Nana Station Traditional sign

Nana station (Thai: สถานีนานา, pronounced [sā.tʰǎː.nīː nāː.nāː]) is a BTS skytrain station, on the Sukhumvit Line in Khlong Toei and Watthana Districts, Bangkok, Thailand. The station is on Sukhumvit Road at Soi Sukhumvit 9, east of Nana intersection (Soi Sukhumvit 3). It is surrounded by a variety of hotels and facilities for foreign tourists. The red-light district and the Nana Plaza area are also in walking distance from the station.

== Facilities ==
- Tourist information office

== See also ==
- Bangkok Skytrain
