= Patpong =

Street in Thailand

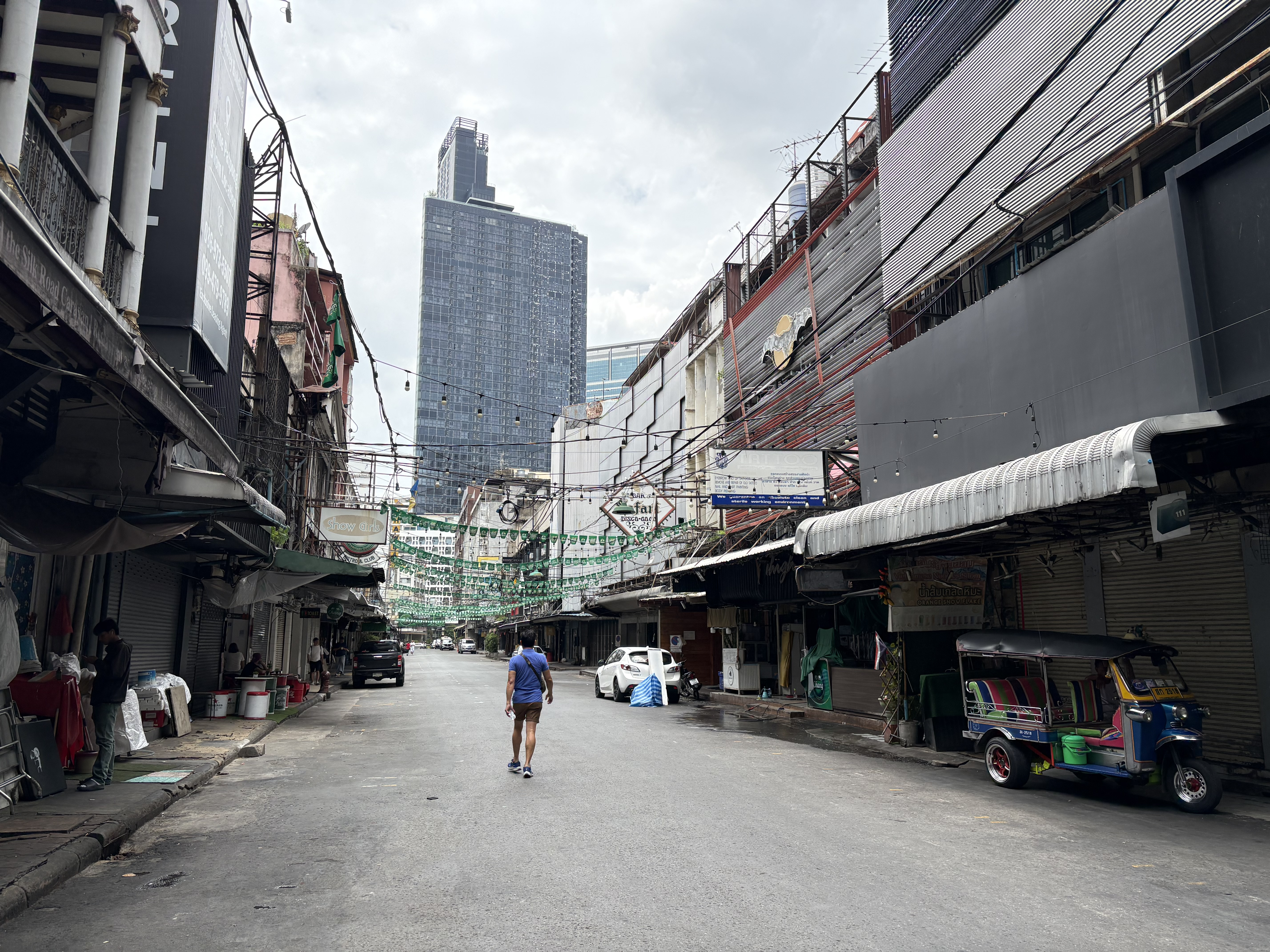
- Patpong at noon on a workday in 2026

- Location within Bangkok
- Location: Bang Rak, Bangkok, Thailand
- Coordinates: 13°43′42″N 100°32′00″E

Patpong (Thai: พัฒน์พงศ์, RTGS: Phat Phong, pronounced [pʰát pʰōŋ]) is an entertainment district in Bangkok's Bang Rak District, Thailand, catering mainly, though not exclusively, to foreign tourists and expatriates. Patpong is internationally known as a red light district at the heart of Bangkok's sex industry. It is the smallest and oldest of several red-light districts in the city. Some of Bangkok's red light districts cater primarily to Thai men while others, like Patpong, cater primarily to foreigners.

Since the early 1990s a busy night market aimed at tourists has also been located in Patpong.

== Location and layout ==
Patpong consists of two parallel side streets running between Silom and Surawong Roads and one side street running from the opposite side of Surawong. Patpong is within walking distance from the BTS Skytrain Silom Line's Sala Daeng Station, and MRT Blue Line's Si Lom Station.

Patpong 1 is the main street with many bars of various kinds. Patpong 2 also has many similar bars. Next to these lies Soi Jaruwan, sometimes referred to as Patpong 3 but best known as Silom Soi 4. It has long catered to gay men, whilst nearby Soi Thaniya has expensive bars with Thai hostesses that cater almost exclusively to Japanese men.

== History and ownership ==
Patpong gets its name from the family that owns much of the area's property. Luang Patpongpanich (or Patpongpanit), an immigrant from Hainan Island, China, purchased the area in 1946. At that time it was an undeveloped plot of land on the outskirts of the city. A small khlong (canal) and a teakwood house were the only features. The family built a road – now called Patpong 1 – and several shop buildings, which were rented out. Patpong 2 was added later, and both roads are private property and not city streets. Soi 4 and Soi Thaniya are not owned by the Patpongpanich family. The old teak house was demolished long ago and the khlong was filled in to make room for more shops. Originally Patpong was an ordinary business area, but the arrival of bars eventually drove out most of the other businesses.

The Grand Prix, Patpong’s first go-go bar, was opened in 1967, with bikini-clad women dancing on an elevated stage. As they were dancing by themselves rather than with men, the bar avoided the legal requirement of having a dance hall licence. The opening of other go-go bars followed, and by 1968 a handful of nightclubs existed in the area. Patpong became an R&R (rest and recuperation) stop for US military officers serving in the Vietnam War, although the main R&R area for GIs was along New Petchburi Road, nicknamed "The Golden Mile". During the 1970s and 1980s, Patpong was the most popular nightlife district in Bangkok for foreigners, and was famous for its sexually explicit shows. In the mid-1980s a weekend street fair called the Patpong Mardi Gras took place annually in the district, raising money for Thai charities. In the early-1990s, however, the Patpongpanich family turned the sidewalks of Patpong 1 Road into a night market, renting out spaces to street vendors.

The consequence was that Patpong lost much of its vibrancy as a nightlife strip, becoming crowded with tourist shoppers who ignored the nightlife. Nana Plaza and Soi Cowboy drew away many of Patpong's thrill seekers. Patpong became a designated "entertainment zone" in 2004, along with Royal City Avenue (RCA) and portions of Ratchadapisek Road, where the largest commercial sex venues are found. This designation allows its bars to stay open until 02:00, instead of the 24:00 or 01:00 legal closing times enforced in other areas.

In October 2019 the Patpong Museum opened in Patpong Soi 2, housing a collection of art, antiques and displays covering 70 years of Patpong's history. The privately owned museum was located on the 2nd floor of building 5 opposite Foodland supermarket and below Black Pagoda. Patpong Museum closed as of May 2023.

== In media ==
A number of Western films have scenes filmed in Patpong. In The Deer Hunter (1978), Patpong was used to evoke Saigon's nightlife during the Vietnam War. The final part of the musical Miss Saigon (1989) is set in the Patpong bar scene.

In Swimming to Cambodia, Spalding Gray discussed the red light district of Patpong and its prostitutes, saying there wasn't much else to see in Bangkok save the Gold Buddha during the day and the whorehouses at night.

The song Welcome to Thailand from the 1987 studio album of the same name by the Thai rock band Carabao contains the lyrics: "Tom, Tom, where you go last night? [...] I love Mueang Thai, I like Patpong". The song complains that Farang tourists (Westerners) are often attracted to the sleazy side of Thailand, specifically Patpong and Pattaya.

The movie Baraka features several shots of strippers in Patpong.

The 1994 book Patpong Sisters: An American Woman's View of the Bangkok Sex World by Cleo Odzer describes the experiences of an anthropologist doing field research in Thailand.

Patpong: Bangkok's Twilight Zone (2001, by Nick Nostitz) is a photographic depiction of aspects of the Patpong night life.

The 2008 book Ladyboys: The Secret World of Thailand's Third Gender paints a portrait of Thailand's kathoeys.

Patpong opera is a collection of songs written by Kevin Wood, manager of Radio City, to tunes of modern rock songs. Together they tell the story of the people in Patpong.

Patpong serves as part of the setting in Tom Robbins' book Villa Incognito.

== See also ==
- Prostitution in Thailand
