= Nana Plaza =

Building in Bangkok, Thailand

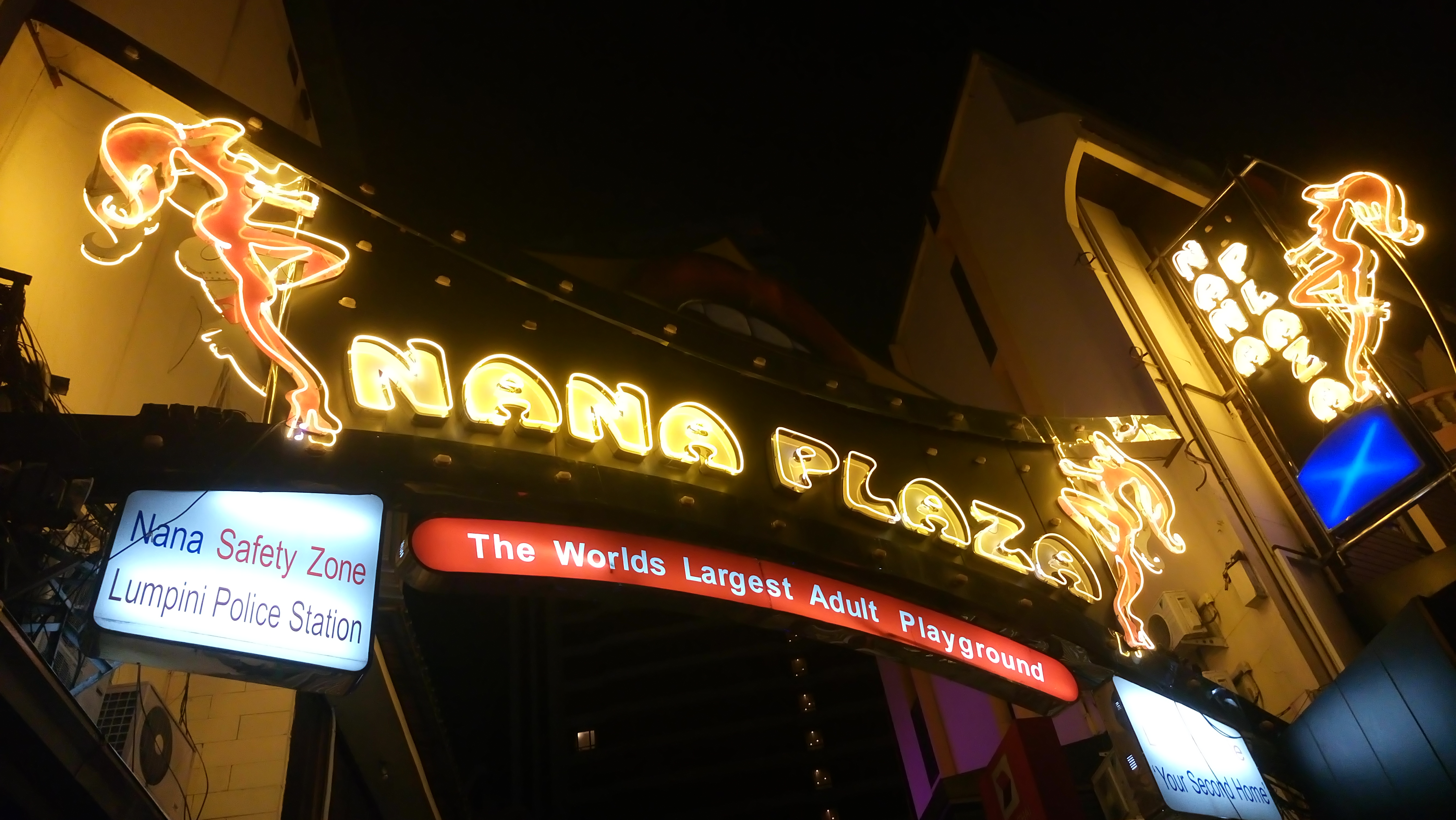
- Nana Plaza entrance sign, 2017

- Location within Bangkok
- Address: 3-3/1 Sukhumvit Soi 4, Sukhumvit Road
- Location: Bangkok, Thailand
- Coordinates: 13°44′28.9″N 100°33′11.4″E
- Owner: Paul Hayward
- Public transit: Nana BTS station

Website
- nanaplazabkk.com

Nana Plaza (formerly Nana Entertainment Plaza) is an entertainment complex and red-light district in Bangkok, Thailand. Originally built as a shopping center, Nana Plaza occupies a three-story commercial building in the Khlong Toei District of Bangkok about 300 metres (330 yd) from the BTS Skytrain's Nana Station. It describes itself as the "world's largest adult playground". Its name originates from the influential, property-holding Nana family, Lek Nana being the most prominent member.

Along with Soi Cowboy and Patpong, Nana Plaza is one of Bangkok's three most concentrated red-light districts. All attract primarily tourists.

== History ==
The plaza's U-shaped building is roughly square-shaped, with a single opening on the west side, and consists of a ground floor and two additional floors arranged around a courtyard. The plaza opened in 1983 and by the mid-1980s around twenty go-go bars had opened in the three-level court, taking advantage of the expansion of tourist hotels in the area.

In 2012, Nana Plaza was sold to Nana Partners Co Ltd., co-owned by Fico Corporation and Panthera Group (formerly known as Eclipse Group) – one of Thailand's largest bar and nightclub operators. Panthera Group renovated the complex, becoming the landlord and providing the management and security services.

== Facilities ==
On the plaza's three floors there are thirty go-go bars, one beer bar and three small short-time hotels that rent out rooms by the hour. Soi 4, the street outside the plaza, is a venue for street prostitution and contains beer bars, massage parlors, and hotels of the conventional and short-time variety. Short-time hotels are rented to patrons taking a bargirl for sex. Most bar girls in Nana Plaza will leave with customers upon payment of a bar fine. Smoking is banned indoors. There are two elevators, one on the north side of the building and one on the south. The building closes at 03:00 and lies dormant until the following evening. In 2016 two waitresses in the plaza's Bangkok Bunnies go-go bar said that they received monthly wages equivalent to £130 (US$165) and daily tips equivalent to £11–16 (US$14–20). This compares with a 2016 average monthly wage in Thailand of around 13,800 baht (US$388).

As of July 2019, there were seven kathoey ("ladyboy") bars in Nana Plaza; Several other bars have a few ladyboys in their line-ups mixed with their regular go-go dancers.

== Gallery ==
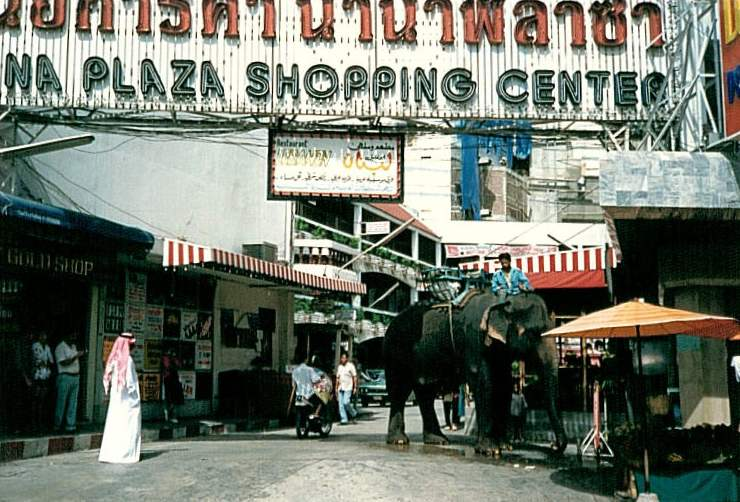
Entrance to Nana Plaza when it was a shopping center

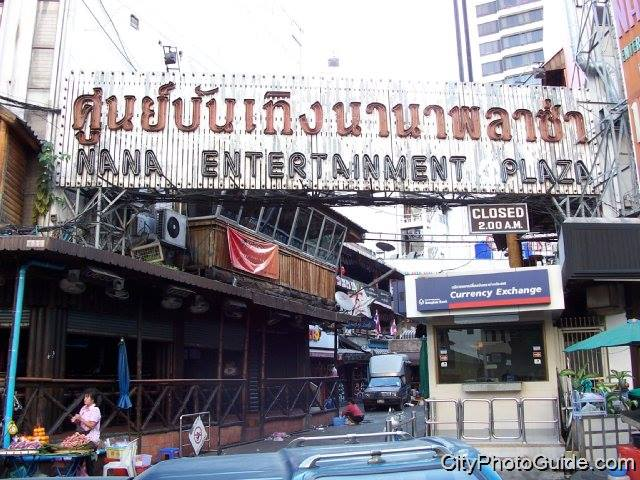
Entrance to Nana Entertainment Plaza showing the old overhead signage

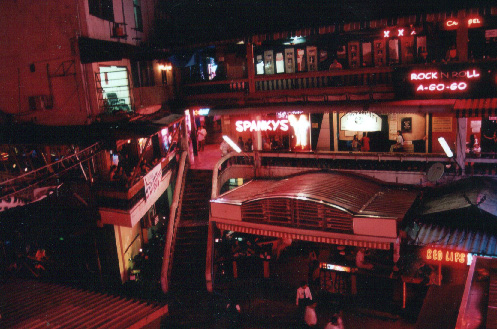
Nana Plaza, May 2004

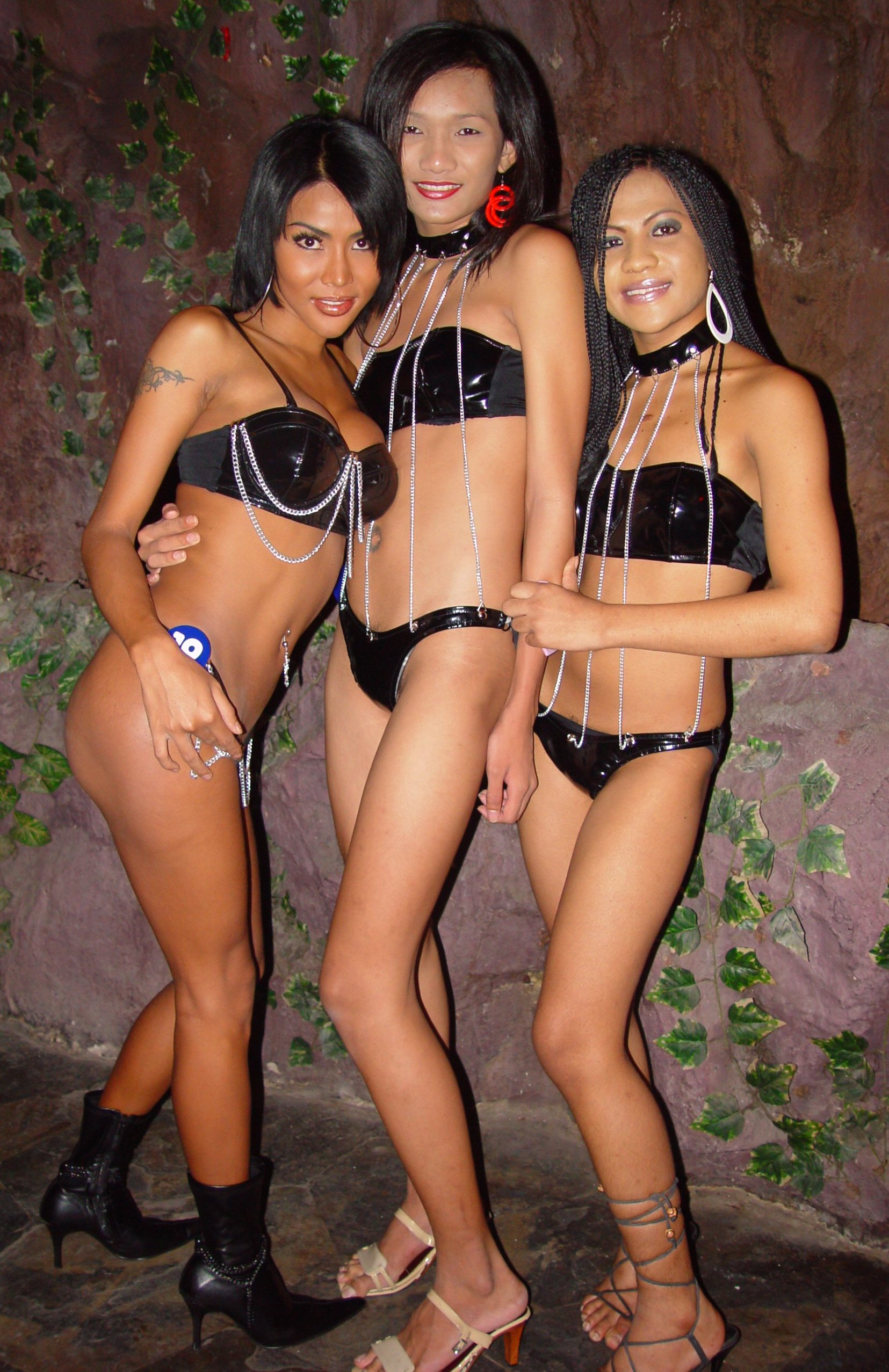
Ladyboys, Cascade Bar

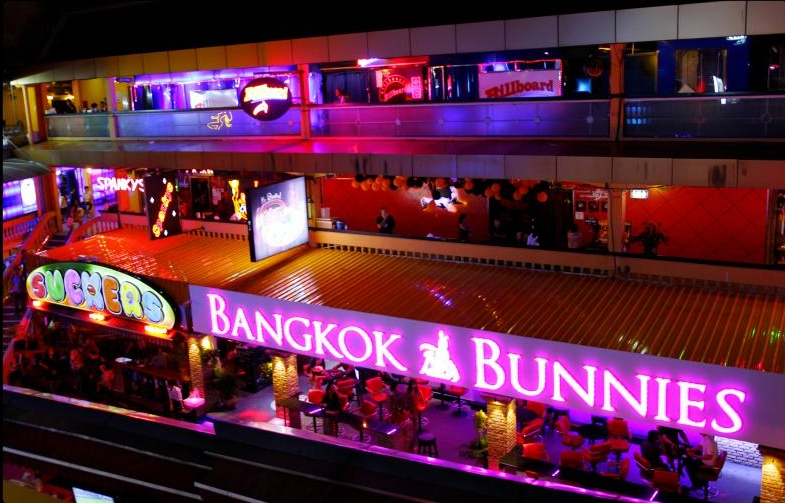
Nana Plaza, November 2015

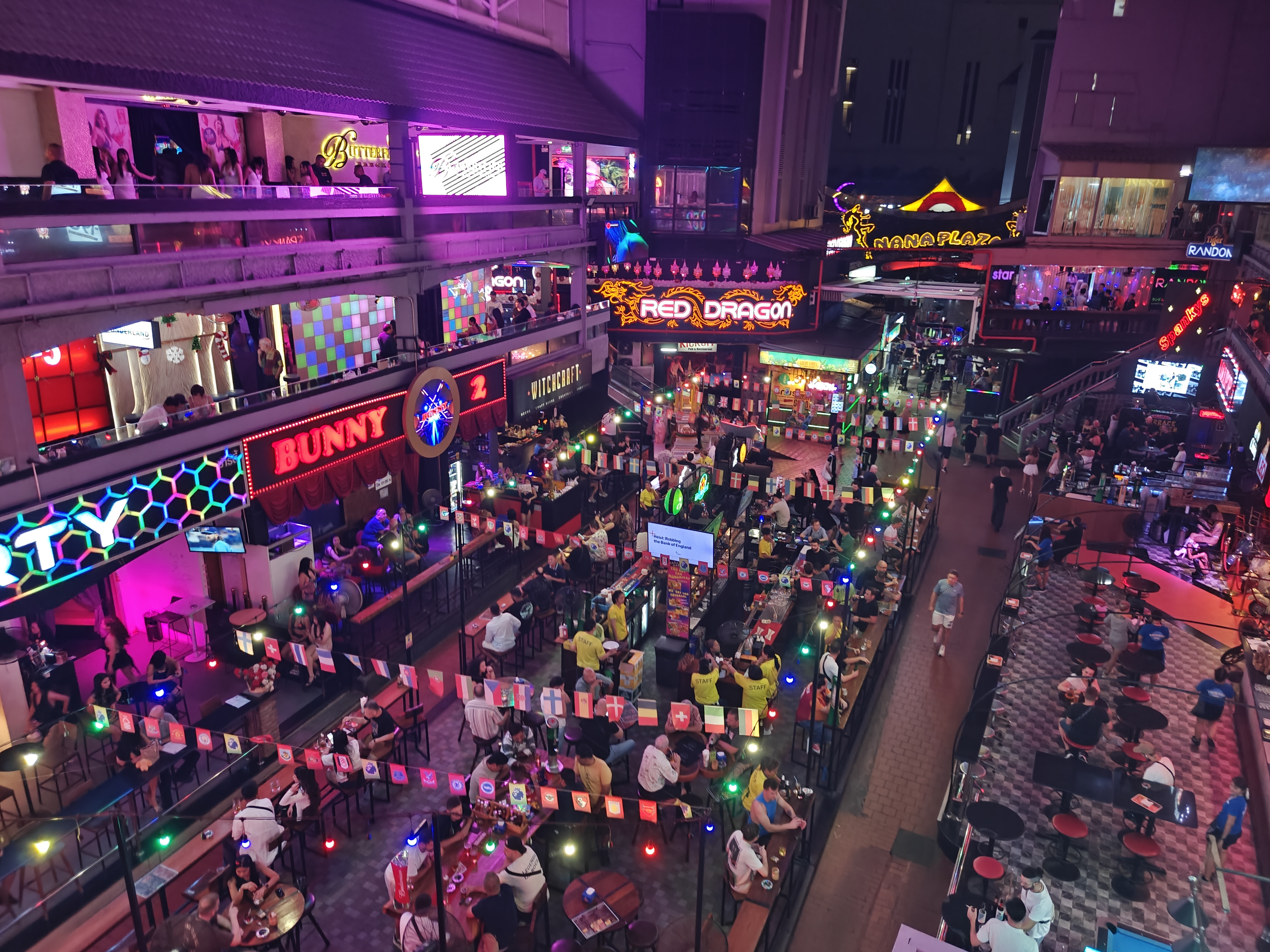
Nana Plaza, November 2025

== See also ==
- Nightlife in Bangkok
- Prostitution in Thailand
