= Bevertainer =

Cocktail waitress who also works as a singer and dancer

Occupation
- Occupation type: Cocktail waitress, singer, dancer
- Activity sectors: Casinos, Las Vegas

Description
- Fields of employment: Food service

A bevertainer is a cocktail waitress who also works as a singer and dancer, usually in casino locations like Las Vegas. The term is a portmanteau of beverage and entertainer.

== Background ==
In 2003, the Rio hotel and casino in Las Vegas introduced their bevertainers, who worked as cocktail servers and as entertainers. When not serving customers, the bevertainers danced in 90-second performances on one of five stages located across the casino floor. The Rio had more than 80 bevertainers. Although the idea initially received skepticism, it was successful.

Actress Jamie Lee Curtis, who played a former showgirl turned bevertainer in the 2024 film The Last Showgirl directed by Gia Coppola, once recounted:

On the first day in Vegas, Gia and I walked around the Rio hotel and casino. There was this beautiful young cocktail waitress, and I was asking her questions, trying to get a little background, and she said, 'I'm not a cocktail waitress; I'm a Bevertainer.' I said, 'What's a Bevertainer?' and she explained that is a beverage server who entertains because that's how they got around the unions.
