= Silliman University School of Public Affairs and Governance =

Public policy school of Silliman University

- Type: Private
- Established: 2007
- Location: Hibbard Avenue, Dumaguete, Philippines
- Website: www.su.edu.ph

The School of Public Affairs and Governance, abbreviated as SPAG, is one of the constituent schools of Silliman University, a private university, in Dumaguete, Philippines. Established in 2007, the school provides instruction in the undergraduate and graduate levels. The school is located at the second floor of the Katipunan Hall at the main campus along Hibbard ave.

== Academics ==
Deans of the School
- Dr. Reynaldo Rivera (2007-2013)
- Atty. Tabitha Espinosa-Tinagan (2013-2015)
- Dr. Jenny Chiu (2015-2018)
- Dr. Jojema Indab (2018-2021)
- Dr. Ferdinand Mangibin (2021–present)

=== Undergraduate ===
- Bachelor of Science in Public Administration (BSPA)
- Bachelor of Science in Foreign Affairs (BSFA)

=== Graduate ===
- Master in Public Administration (MPA) with specialization in either:
  - Local Governance; or
  - Fiscal Administration
- Master in Environmental Governance (MEG)

=== Post-Graduate ===
- Doctor of Philosophy in Social Science (Ph.D. in Social Science)
- Doctor of Public Administration (DPA)
