= Silliman University =

Private university in Dumaguete, Philippines

- Pamantasang Silliman (Filipino)
- The University Seal
- Former names: Silliman Institute (1901–1938)
- Motto: Via, Veritas, Vita (Latin)
- Motto in English: The Way, the Truth, and the Life
- Founder: David S. Hibbard
- Benefactor: Horace B. Silliman
- Type: Private, nonsectarian, research university, coeducational
- Established: August 28, 1901; 125 years ago
- Religious affiliation: In covenant with the United Church of Christ in the Philippines, but neither owned nor governed by the UCCP or any religious organization.
- Academic affiliations: ACUCA, UBCHEA, ACSCU, ASAIHL, PAASCU, ATESEA
- Chairman: Ricardo A. Balbido Jr.
- President: Betty Cernol-McCann
- Academic staff: 490 (faculty)
- Administrative staff: 290
- Students: approx. 11,000
- Location: Hibbard Avenue, Dumaguete, Negros Oriental, Philippines; 9°18′46″N 123°18′24″E
- Campus: • Main Campus [Urban] (Hibbard Avenue, Dumaguete) – 33 ha (82 acres); • Agriculture and Marine Biology Campus (Escaño Road, Dumaguete, Negros Oriental) – 29 ha (72 acres); • Ticao Island Facility (Ticao Island, Masbate) – 465 ha (1,150 acres)
- Newspaper: The Weekly Sillimanian
- Alma Mater song: Silliman Song
- Colors: and Red and white
- Nickname: Silliman Red Stallions
- Sporting affiliations: PRISAA, UNIGAMES
- Mascots: Stallions and Mares
- Website: www.su.edu.ph
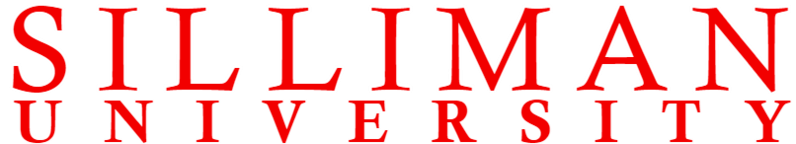

- Location in the Visayas Location in the Philippines

Silliman University (also referred to as Silliman or SU) is a private Protestant research university in Dumaguete City, Philippines. Established in 1901 as Silliman Institute by the Presbyterian Board of Foreign Missions, it is the first Protestant institution of higher education in the Philippines and in Asia.

The university was named after Dr. Horace Brinsmade Silliman, a retired businessman and philanthropist from Cohoes, New York who provided the initial sum of $10,000 for the establishment of the school. Starting as an elementary school for boys, the school expanded to become a college in 1910, acquiring university status in 1938. Silliman University was run and operated by Americans during the first half of the 20th century. After the Second World War, Filipinos began to assume more administrative positions, culminating in the appointment of the university's first Filipino president in 1952.

More than 10,000 students from the Philippines and at least 56 other countries are enrolled in ten colleges, five schools, and three institutes. It is registered as a National Historical Landmark by the National Historical Institute and is one of the few private higher education institutions in the Philippines that have been granted full autonomous status by the Commission on Higher Education. It is also a founding member of the Association of Christian Universities and Colleges in Asia (ACUCA) and one of the recognized institutions in the U.S. Veterans Administration's list of approved educational institutions.

== History ==
=== Founding and Early Development ===
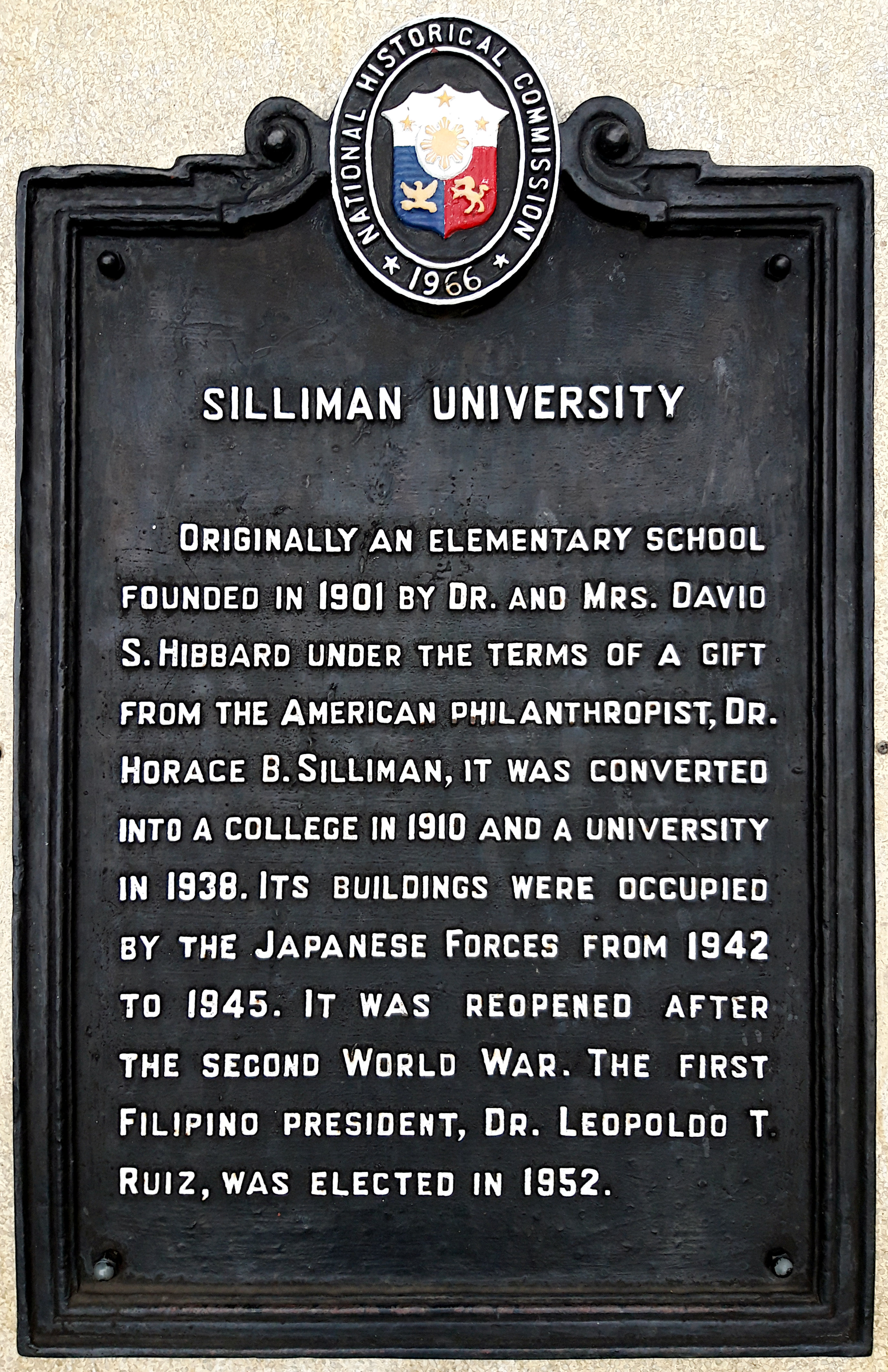
National Historical Commission marker installed in 1966.

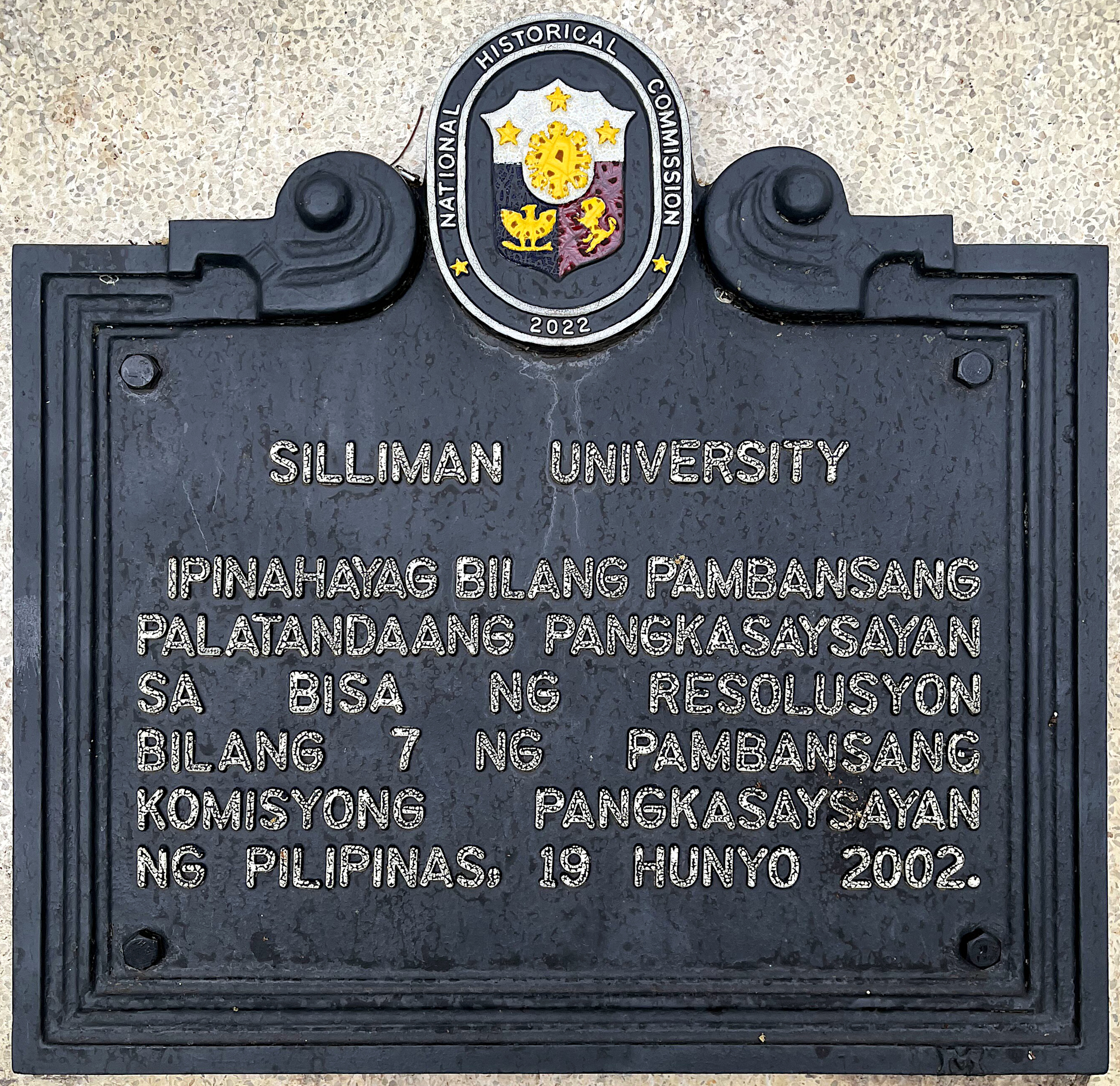
National Historical Landmark marker installed in 2022.

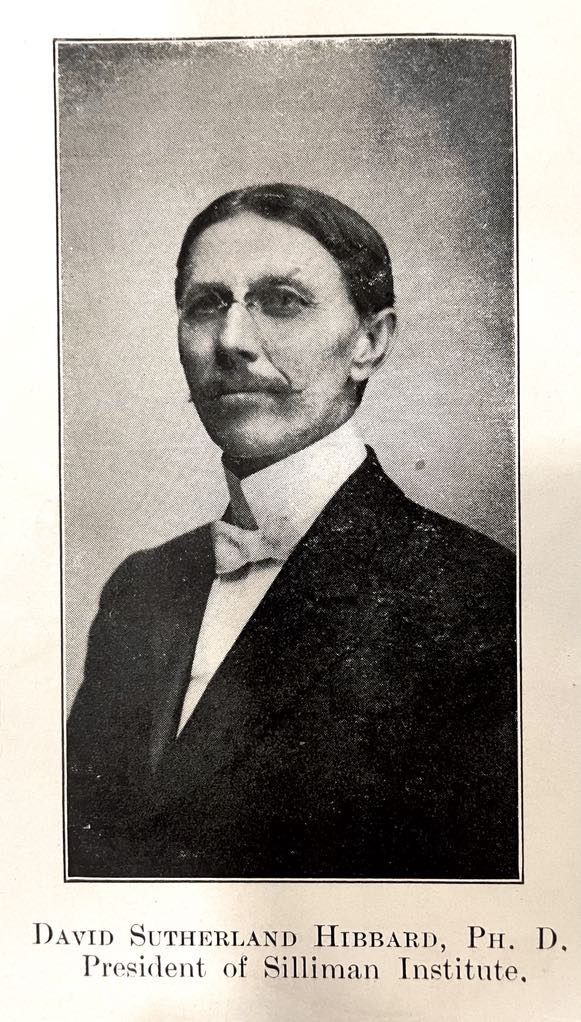
Dr. David Sutherland Hibbard in a 1914 yearbook of Silliman Institute.

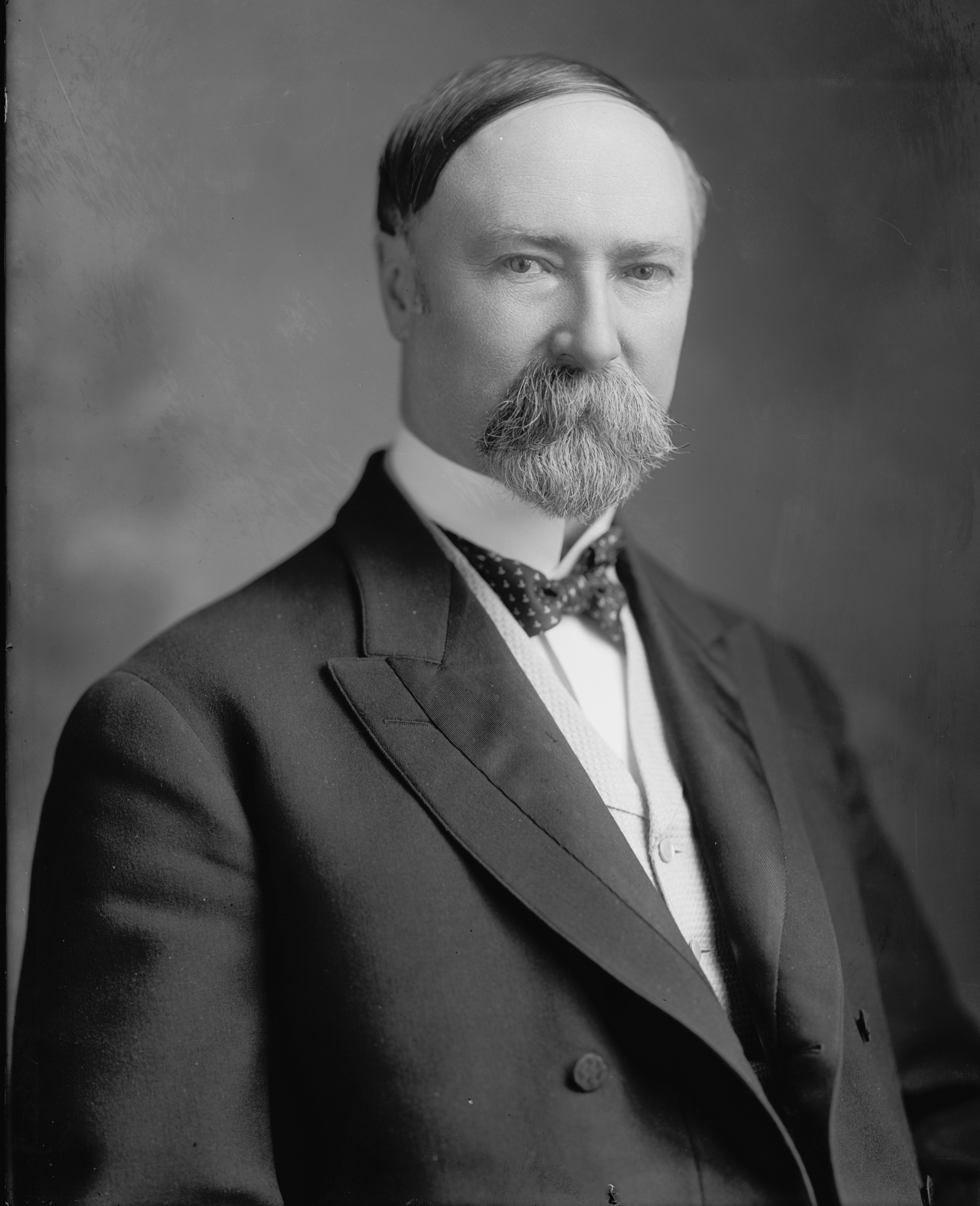
US Vice President Charles W. Fairbanks visited Silliman Institute in 1909.

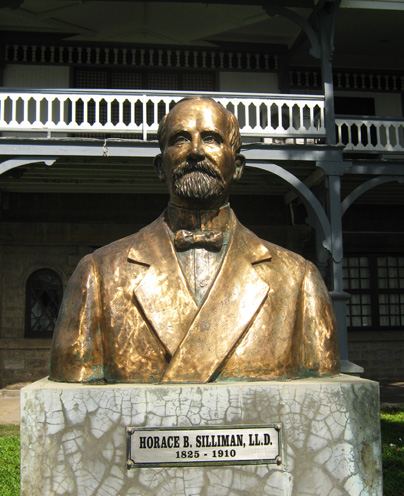
Horace Silliman. The University's first benefactor and namesake.

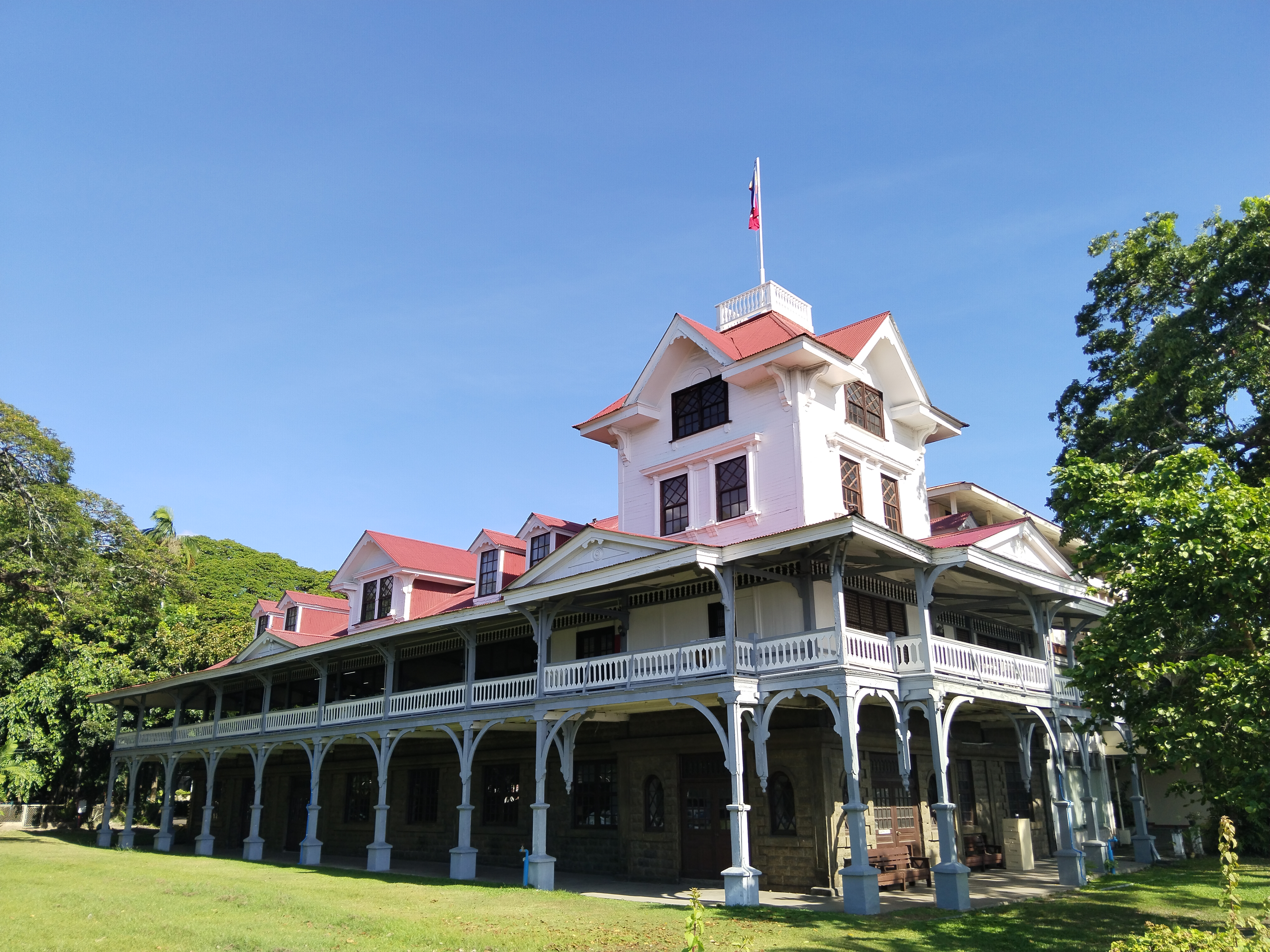
Silliman Hall is the oldest standing American structure in the Philippines. The design of the building is reminiscent of the Stick style architecture that characterize American buildings in the late 19th century. Some of the materials used to build it were salvaged from an old theater in New York. The present structure was built in 1909 as an addition to the original structure built in 1902, now demolished. It presently houses the university's Heritage Museum.

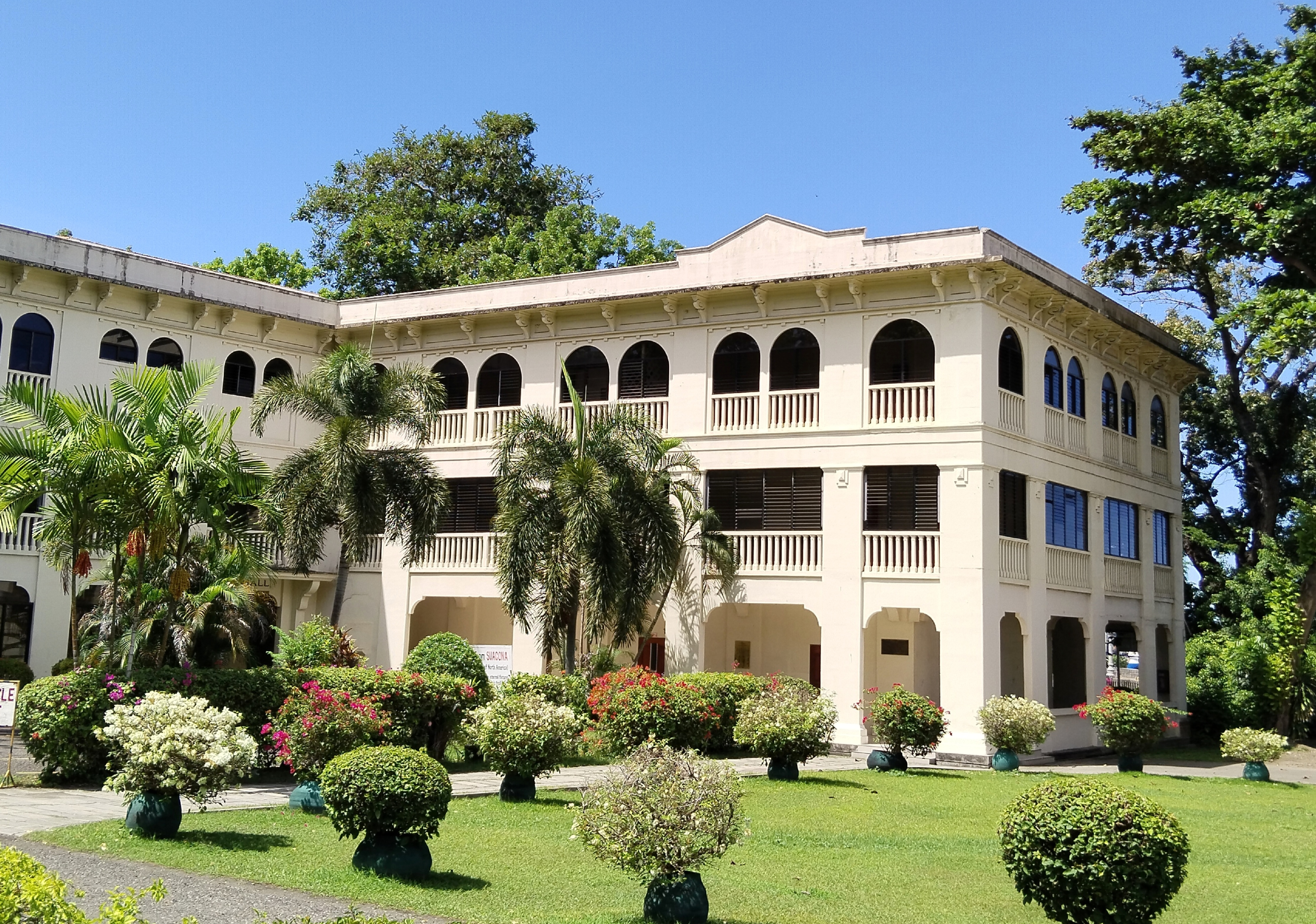
Guy Hall, built in 1918, was one of the buildings occupied by Japanese troops during World War II.

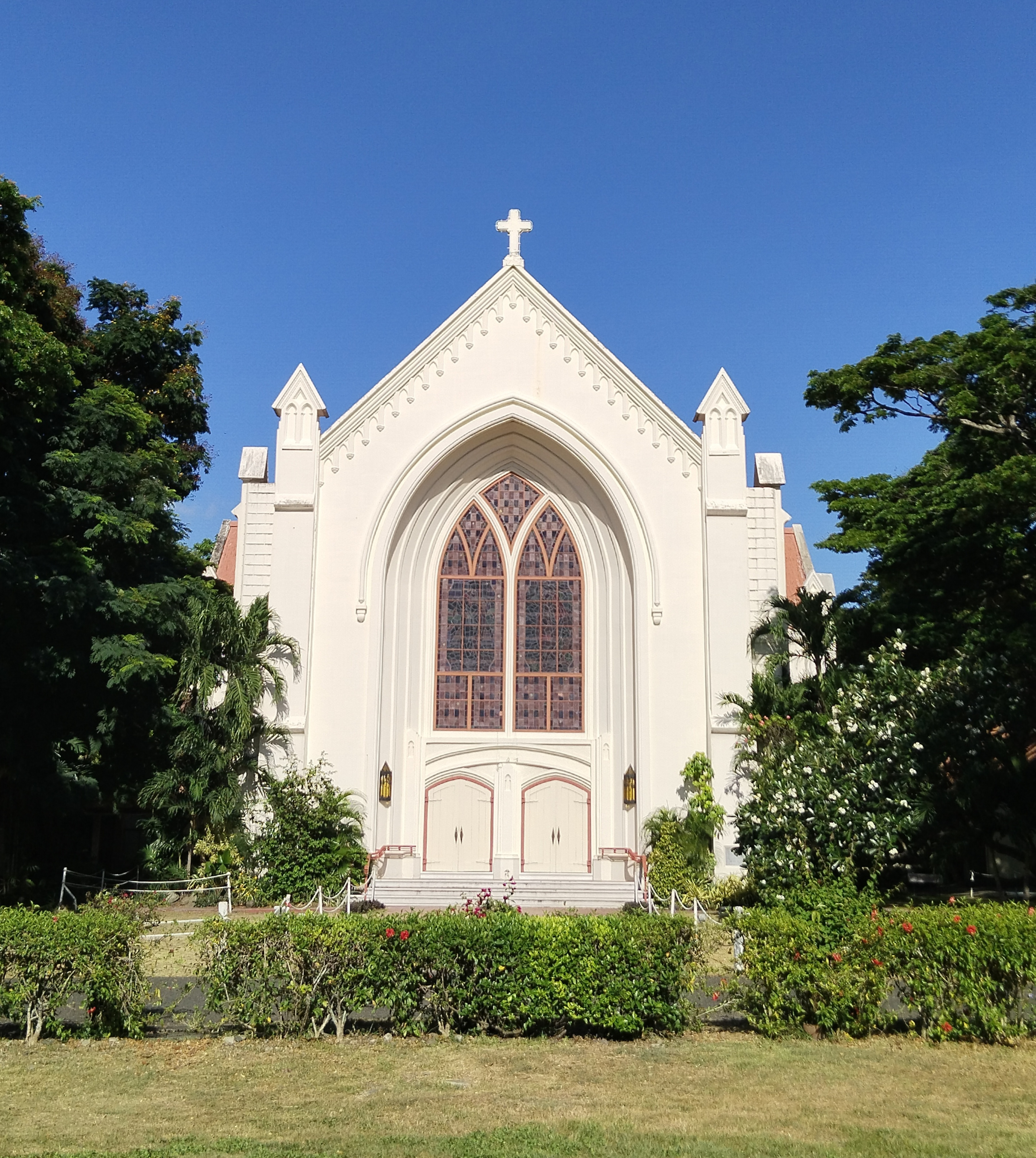
An early morning photograph of the Silliman University Church. Construction for the church building began in 1941. Due to interruptions brought by World War II, it was completed only in 1949.

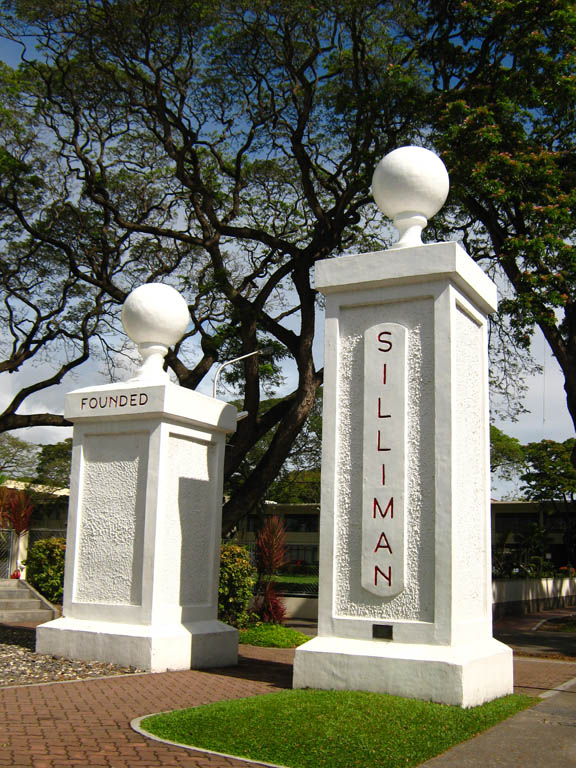
The western side of the Gate of Knowledge is one of the iconic portals of Silliman University. Built in the 1950s, this landmark now serves as the main entrance to the main campus. The original portal, called the Gate of Opportunity (built circa 1901–1905), is on the southeastern side of the campus facing the Rizal Boulevard. Silliman's portals have become the de facto symbol for the university and the City of Dumaguete. It has also been incorporated into the provincial seal of the Province of Negros Oriental.

Silliman University was founded on August 28, 1901, as Silliman Institute by Protestant missionaries under the Board of Foreign Missions of the Presbyterian Church in the United States. Originally established as an elementary school for boys, the institute began operations through an initial $10,000 donation from Dr. Horace Brinsmade Silliman, a retired businessman and Christian philanthropist from Cohoes, New York, who sought to establish an industrial school based on the Hampton Institute model of Virginia.

The person tasked by the Presbyterian Board of Foreign Missions to establish the school was Dr. David Sutherland Hibbard, a man from Lyndon, Kansas, who, after serving as a pastor in a Presbyterian church in that locality, offered his services to the Board as missionary. Upon his arrival in the Philippines, he was commissioned, along with his wife Laura, to scout the southern part of the islands to determine the best location for the school. His original destination were Cebu, Zamboanga and Iloilo. While in Cebu, he received a suggestion to make a side-trip to Dumaguete. Upon his arrival there, he was met by a Rev. Captain John Anthony Randolph, chaplain of the sixth U.S. Infantry Regiment stationed at Dumaguete at the time, who later introduced him to Don Meliton Larena, the town's local presidente and to his brother Demetrio Larena, then the vice-governor of the province. Hibbard was drawn to the place and decided to establish the school in the locality. He would later write that the "beauty of Dumaguete and the friendliness of the people" helped in bringing about his decision.

The institute had a modest beginning: Dr. and Mrs. Hibbard held classes in a rented house beside the sea until the institute's first building, Silliman Hall, was completed in 1903. Recalling how the university started half a century later, Dr. Hibbard described:

"There were fifteen boys that first morning. The equipment consisted of four desks about ten feet long, two tables and two chairs, a few McGuffey’s Readers, a few geographies, arithmetics and ninth-grade grammars. I was President; Mrs. Hibbard was the faculty."

Enrollment in the school grew attracting students from other Asian countries. In 1909, Silliman Institute was visited by US Vice President Charles W. Fairbanks. In 1910, it was awarded government recognition and the right to grant a degree. In the same year, it was incorporated under the laws of the Philippines. Women began to be admitted in 1912, with Pura Blanco as its first female student, and in 1921, the Silliman Bible School (later to become the Divinity School) was established in cooperation with the American Board of Commissioners for Foreign Missions, which largely represented the Congregational Churches of the United States. As enrollment in the institution continued to grow, a corresponding increase in faculty followed. These developments were accompanied by the adoption of a more advanced curriculum and the construction and acquisition of more permanent buildings and equipment. Of note was Emilio Aguinaldo's decision to send his sons to Silliman Institute. By 1925, it was already recognized as "the most influential Protestant institution of higher learning" in the Philippines, according to a report submitted by the Board of Educational Survey, which was created by the Philippine Legislature to conduct a study on all educational institutions in the country. The institute was re-incorporated in 1935, and in 1938 became the first school outside of Manila to be granted university status.

After its recognition as a university, Silliman continued to receive grants for land, buildings and equipment from the Presbyterian Board and the American Board (now the United Church Board for World Ministries). In addition, these boards provided the university with American faculty and staff. Two other American boards contributed personnel and funds: the Board of Missions of the United Methodist Church and the United Christian Missionary Society of the Christian Churches (Disciples of Christ).

=== World War II ===
Life at the university was interrupted when World War II broke out. On May 26, 1942, some three weeks after the fall of Corregidor, two Japanese transports anchored in Dumaguete. Silliman was occupied by the Japanese forces and was converted to a garrison. One of its buildings, Channon Hall, became the headquarters of the dreaded Japanese kempeitai or military police where many Filipinos were tortured and killed. During the occupation, many members of the faculty and the student body were forced to evacuate to four localities within the province. Under the leadership of Dr. Arthur Carson, then president of Silliman, the remaining members of the faculty continued university operations in the mountains of Negros Oriental. This led to the formation of what was then known as the "Jungle University" in Malabo, Valencia, one of the localities in the province. University Professor Roy Bell became a major in the Negros Island guerrilla forces, established a Free Government, printed the Victory News, and used his radio transmitter to establish contact with the South West Pacific Area (command). Many students, alumni, faculty members and ROTC officers joined the resistance forces, while theology professors Alvin Scaff, Proculo Rodriguez, Paul Lindholm and James McKinley "carried on pastoral and teaching duties for the resistance soldiers and civilians in guerrilla-dominated territory." The Carson and Bell families, plus other faculty members, were evacuated by the USS Narwhal (SS-167) on February 7, 1944.

American and Filipino forces liberated Dumaguete on April 26, 1945. A few days later, the Faculty Emergency Committee took charge of the campus and began preparations for the resumption of classes and the challenge of reconstruction.

=== Post-war years ===
For the first half of the century, Silliman was run and operated by Americans. After the Second World War and until the early 1950s, efforts toward the Filipinization of the university administration began to surface. Filipino faculty members began to assume significant positions and, as more of them took on administrative roles, the board of trustees elected the university's first Filipino president, Dr. Leopoldo T. Ruiz, on August 26, 1952. He officially took office in April 1953. A Silliman alumnus (A.B. 1916) and a graduate of the University of California at Berkeley (B.A. 1920), Ruiz had an extensive experience in higher education and foreign service. Before his appointment, he pursued graduate studies in sociology at Columbia and Yale, earning an M.A. (1924) from the former, and a Ph.D. (1942) from the University of Southern California.

In the same decade as Ruiz's appointment, the United Board for Christian Higher Education in Asia (UBCHEA), an interdenominational group based in New York, assumed responsibility for channeling all church aid to Silliman. The United Board is an international organization supported by ten Protestant mission boards. The 1960s saw a decreasing American representation in the faculty and the engagement of new batch of professors of other nationalities. During this time, faculty members of South Korean, British, Scottish, German, Dutch and of Indonesian nationalities, among others also joined the faculty. By 1970, the Divinity School was the most international among academic units on campus. Up to most recent times, however, American and foreign visiting professors are still assigned in specialized areas.

In the early 1960s and toward the beginning of the Martial Law years, the university embarked on a "Build a Greater Silliman" program. This is in response to the growing student population and the corresponding need for additional facilities. With significant support from many donors, mostly alumni and entities from abroad, the program led to the construction of more academic buildings, dormitories, faculty housing units, and other facilities. These included the now-famous Luce Auditorium which was funded largely by the Henry Luce Foundation; the Science Complex, equipped with an observatory on top of the third floor; the Engineering Complex; and the Silliman University Medical Center.

=== Martial law era ===
When Martial Law was declared in 1972, Silliman was closed down by the government. It was one of the first two universities to be closed, and one of the last to be reopened. On the morning of September 23, 1972 some faculty members and many students were rounded up by the local Philippine Constabulary (now the Philippine National Police), some of whom were detained for one to six months. Many offices of the university, including the Weekly Sillimanian, the student paper, were raided by the PC. Journalist Crispin Maslog, who was teaching in the university at the time, recalls that Marcos himself had complained about instances where members of the political opposition such as Senator Jovito Salonga and Senator Juan Liwag were invited to speak at the university.

The year 1979 became a landmark year for Silliman when its Van Houweling Research Laboratory, then headed by Dr. George Beran, produced a dog vaccine that gave a three-year immunity from rabies, making it the first and only laboratory to produce a rabies vaccine with long-term immunity in the whole of Southeast Asia. The development of the vaccine resulted in the elimination of rabies in many parts of the Visayas and Mindanao Islands and was later on used by other countries in their fight against rabies conducted in collaboration with the World Health Organization.

=== 1980s to recent history ===
The 1980s saw the restoration of the university's Student Government and the approval of its constitution. After years of suppression by the Marcos regime, students were again allowed to organize in 1981. The decade also witnessed the 100% board exam ratings of the Electrical Engineering, Nursing and Accountancy programs and the installation of solar-powered light posts in the campus in the years 1986 and 1989 respectively.

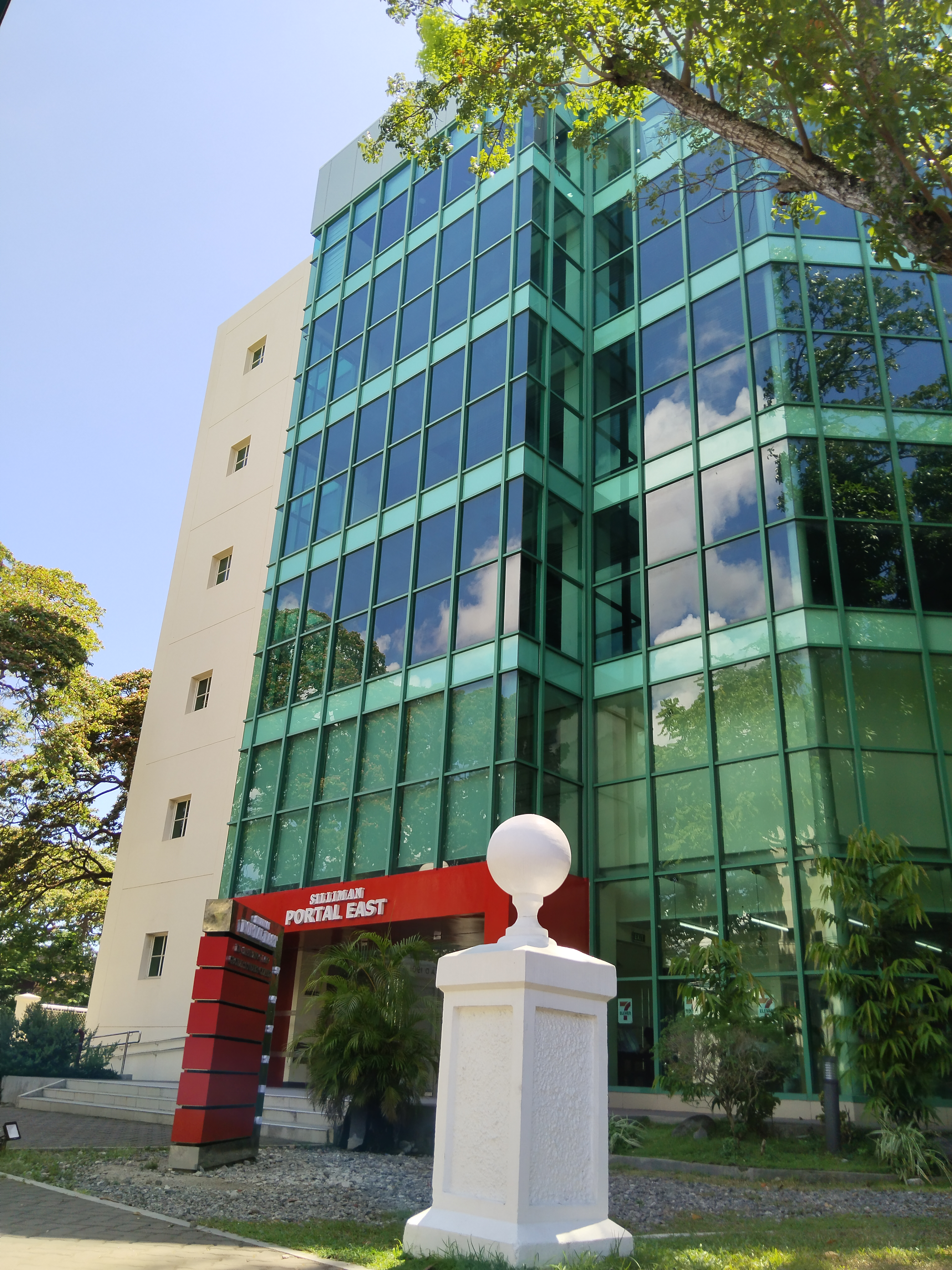
Portal East Building, one of the twin portal buildings on the campus. The other is Portal West.

In the 1990s the university shifted its grading system from alphabetical to numerical. In 1994, eleven Sillimanians landed in the top ten of that year's nursing board exam, with twenty two other Sillimanian takers occupying the top twenty posts. In that same year, Silliman alumnus Gonzalo O. Catan Jr. was awarded Most Outstanding Inventor in the fifth National Technology Fair. The decade also witnessed Silliman being cited as the university with the best published scientific paper in the Dr. Elvira O. Tan Awards; and in 1995, the university hosted the first ever International Conference on Biology and Conservation of Small Cetaceans of Southeast Asia, as well as the International Coral Reef Initiative Workshop.

Toward the end of the decade, Silliman prepared for its centennial celebrations. To strengthen its local area network technology, the university installed fiber-optic cables that span the entire 62 hectare campus in 1999. In 2000, the Silliman Accountancy program ranked first in the country, culminating in its Physical Therapy program ranking first in 2001.

Silliman University continues to draw support from the United Board for Christian Higher Education in Asia (UBCHEA), as well as from its alumni and other benefactors. The university has adopted a policy of providing education to the surrounding regions without depending much on tuition and other fees to meet its operational expenses. Recently, Silliman constructed the Portal West Building, a five-storey commercial building on campus, to help augment its operational expenses. In line with the same policy, it has leased portions of its properties to business entities to further raise its financial base.

Because significant portion of the student population ride on motorbikes and scooters, the university has also aggressively adopted a "No Helmet-No Entry" policy. Silliman has likewise adopted a "No-Smoking Policy" on campus.

Owing to its rich history, the university was declared as a National Historical Landmark by the National Historical Institute on June 19, 2002. A marker stating this declaration was installed inside the campus on September 23, 2022.

Silliman is one of few private higher educational institutions in the country with full autonomous status granted by the Commission on Higher Education (CHED), the same government agency that recognized some of its programs as Centers of Excellence and Centers of Development.

== Campus ==
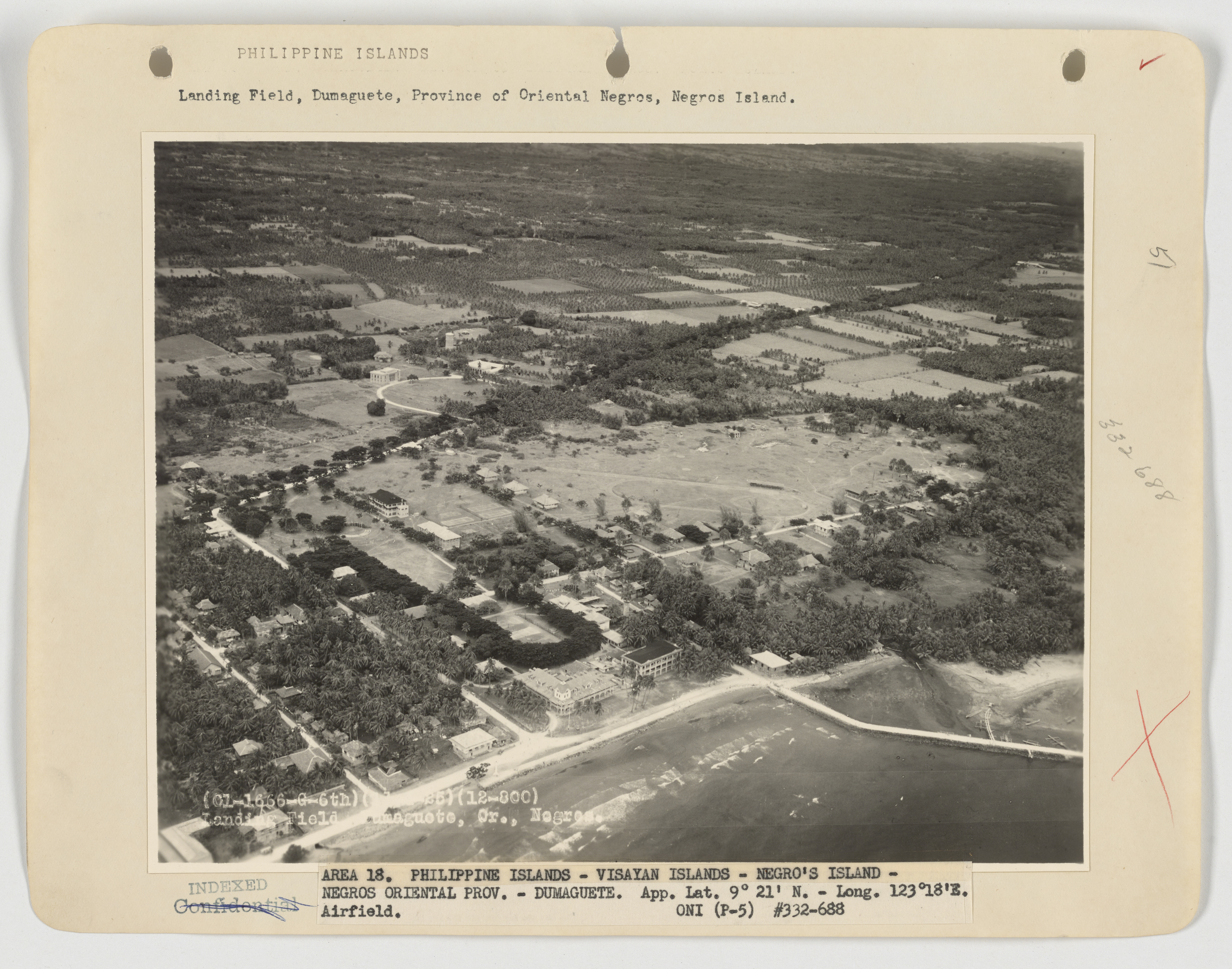
Pre-World War II aerial view of Dumaguete, showing the Silliman campus. Hibbard Hall, constructed in 1932, is not yet visible in the picture.

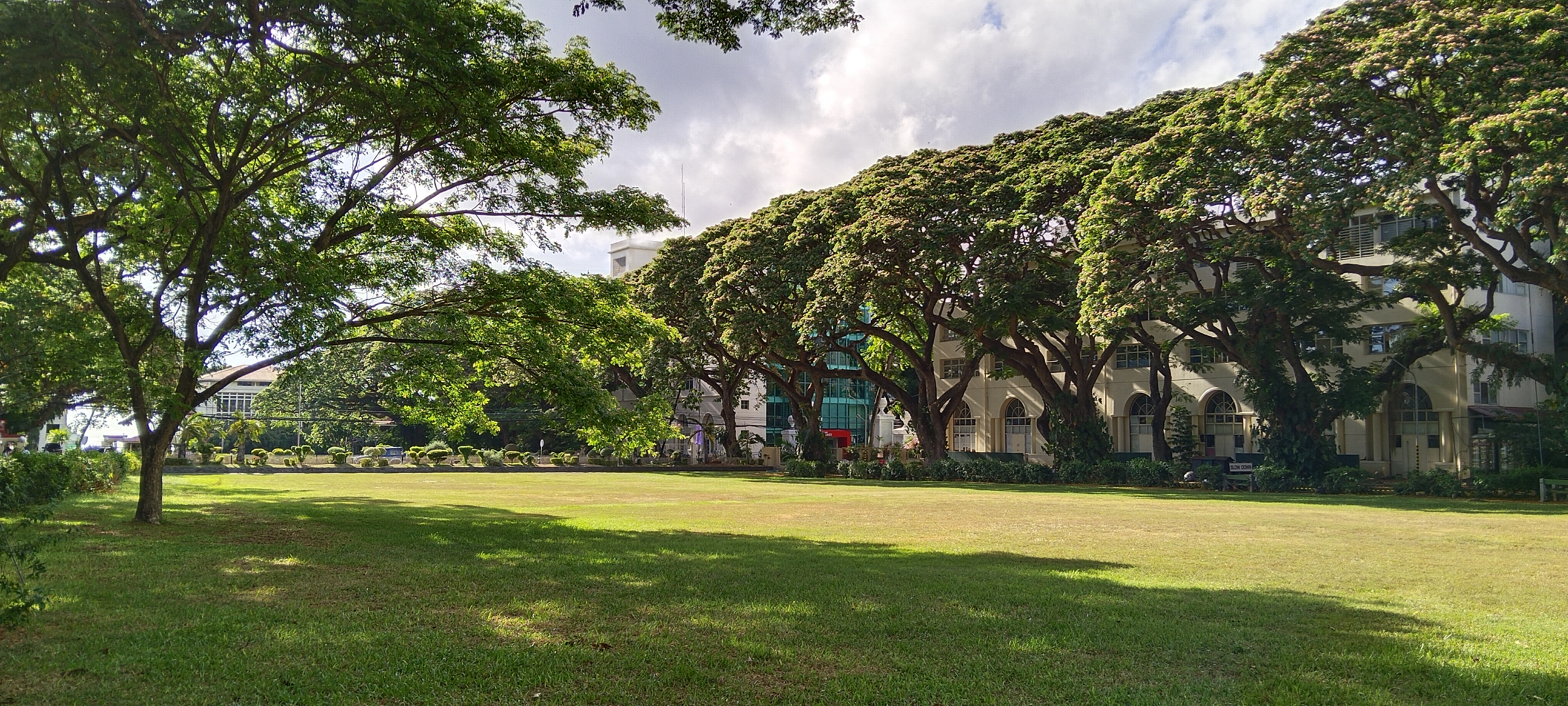
Treeline along the west quadrangle along the Portal Buildings.

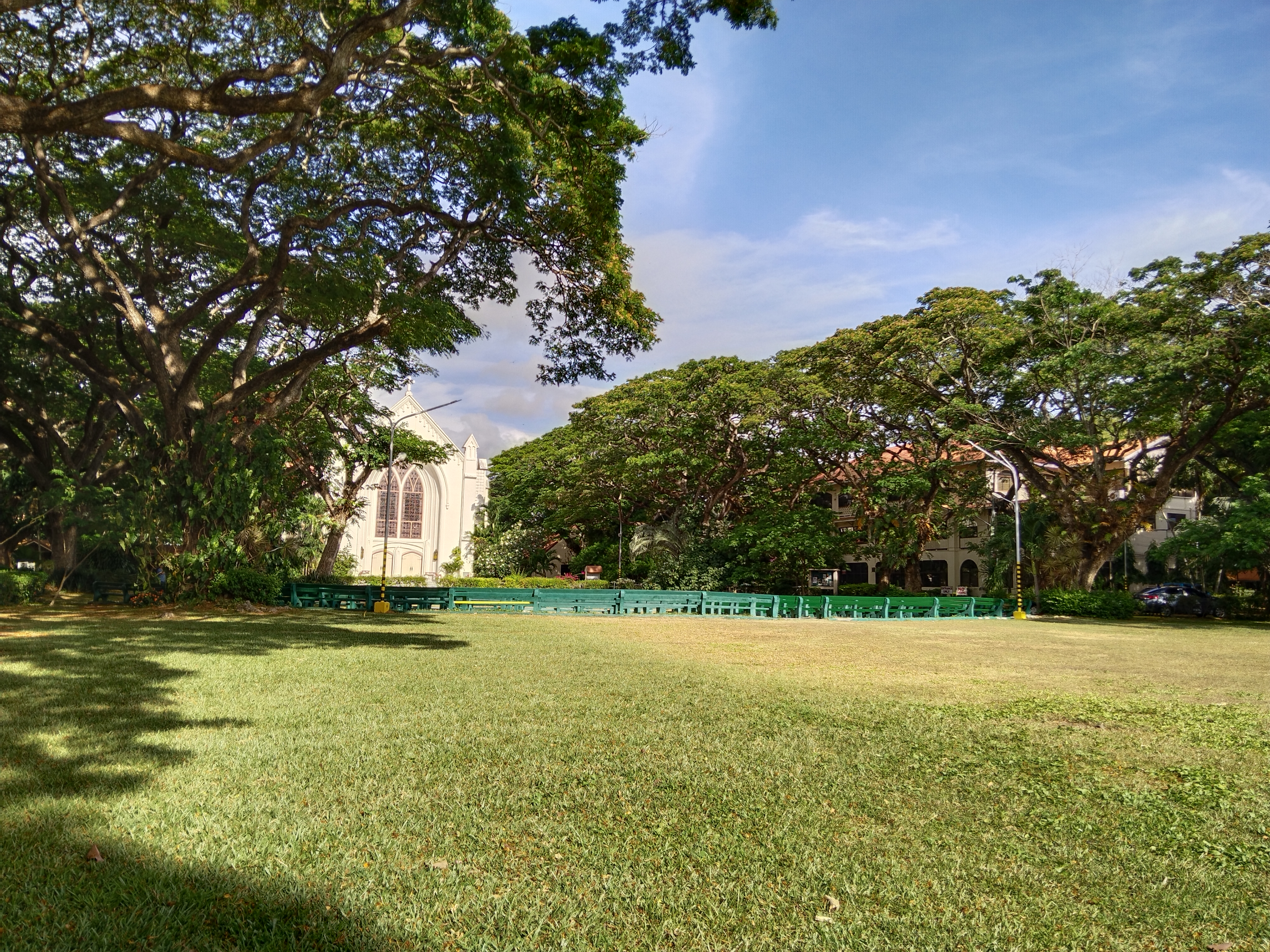
Treeline along the Silliman University Church.

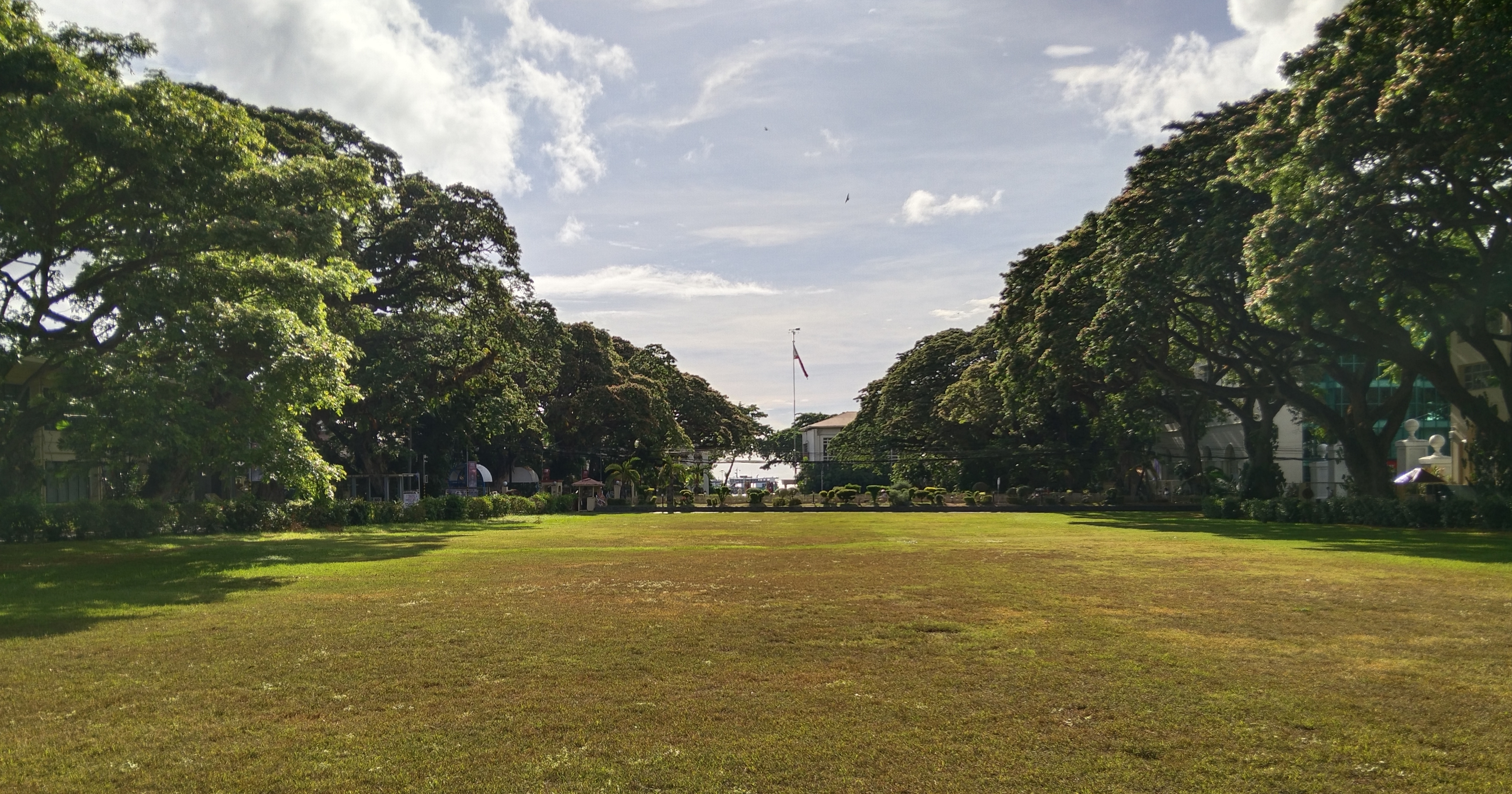
Treeline on both sides of the west quadrangle.

Silliman is located in Dumaguete, a quiet and peaceful seaside community with a population of 142,171. The university campus has a total land area of 62 hectares composed of the main campus along Hibbard Avenue, and the campus for the College of Agriculture and the Institute of Environmental and Marine Sciences to the north. Dotted by large acacia trees, the main campus is home to most of the colleges and schools of the university and is adjacent to the city's downtown district. Occupying almost one-third of the downtown area, the campus faces the sea to the east, flanked by its portals which are now considered symbols of the school and city. The three most prominent portals are the Gates of Knowledge, Opportunity and Service. The Gate of Knowledge is the current and main entrance; it is the starting point of the two-kilometer-long Hibbard Avenue which was named after Dr. David Sutherland Hibbard, one of the founders of the institution. The other prominent landmarks on the main campus are the Silliman Hall, which now houses the Heritage Museum; the Silliman University Church; the Robert B. and Metta J. Silliman Library; and the Claire Isabel McGill Luce Auditorium, the largest theater outside Metro Manila. It is frequented by tourists so the university maintains a campus cruiser, a 15-seater golf cart or tram-like vehicle, to ferry visitors around the campus. It is used to transport students during regular days.

Two kilometers to the north (the other end of Hibbard Avenue) is the campus for the College of Agriculture and the Institute of Environmental and Marine Sciences. It has a land area of 29 hectares, and houses the College of Agriculture Complex, the Silliman Farm, a number of dormitories (known as the Cocofed Dormitories) and the Marine Laboratories of the Institute of Environmental and Marine Sciences. Adjacent to it is the Silliman Beach.

Silliman has off-campus facilities located in Camp Lookout, Valencia and on Ticao Island, in the Province of Masbate. The Camp Lookout facility houses the university's Creative Writing Center which now serves as the venue and permanent home of the Silliman National Writers Workshop. The center has a two-storey main function hall and five duplex cottages.

The university's Ticao Island facility, on the other hand, is a 465-hectare property in the Province of Masbate, another island in Bicol Region. Donated by the family of Elizabeth How, the facility is a combination of a working ranch, agricultural plantations, and patches of secondary forests. Since then, Silliman has established a technical-vocational school in partnership with TESDA. Under its most recent structure, it is facilitated through the SU TEVEC.

Dumaguete has been called a "center of learning in the south" or a "university town" due to the presence of Silliman and other universities that have made their mark nationally and abroad. The city has become a melting pot of students, professionals, artists, scholars and the literati coming from the country and the world.

=== Theaters and museums ===
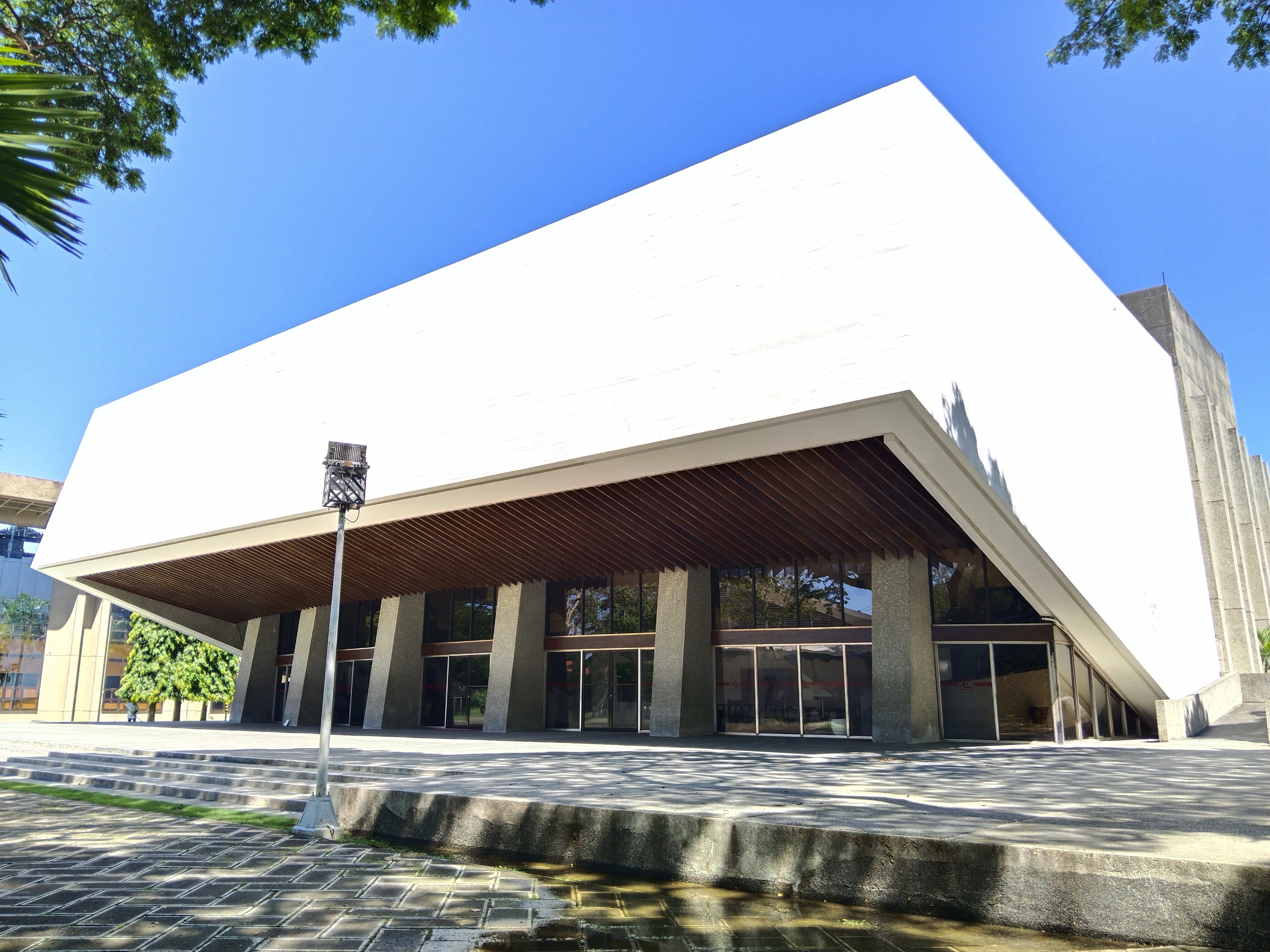
The Claire Isabel McGill Luce Auditorium (built 1973–75) is named after the wife of Henry Luce III, elder son of Henry Luce who is the founder and editor-in-chief of Time magazine. Its construction was mainly funded by the Henry Luce Foundation.

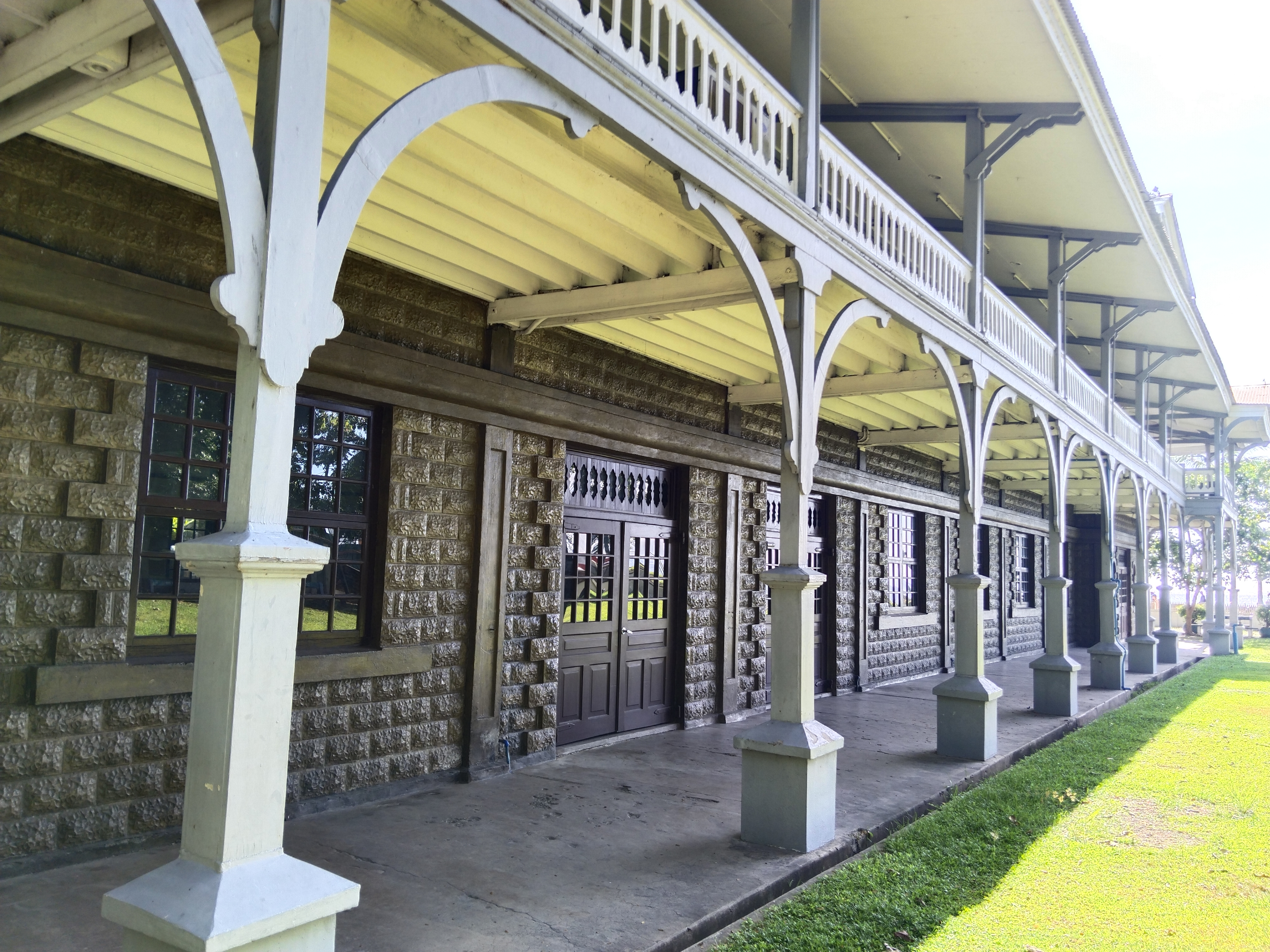
Ground floor terrace of the Silliman Hall which now houses the Heritage Museum.

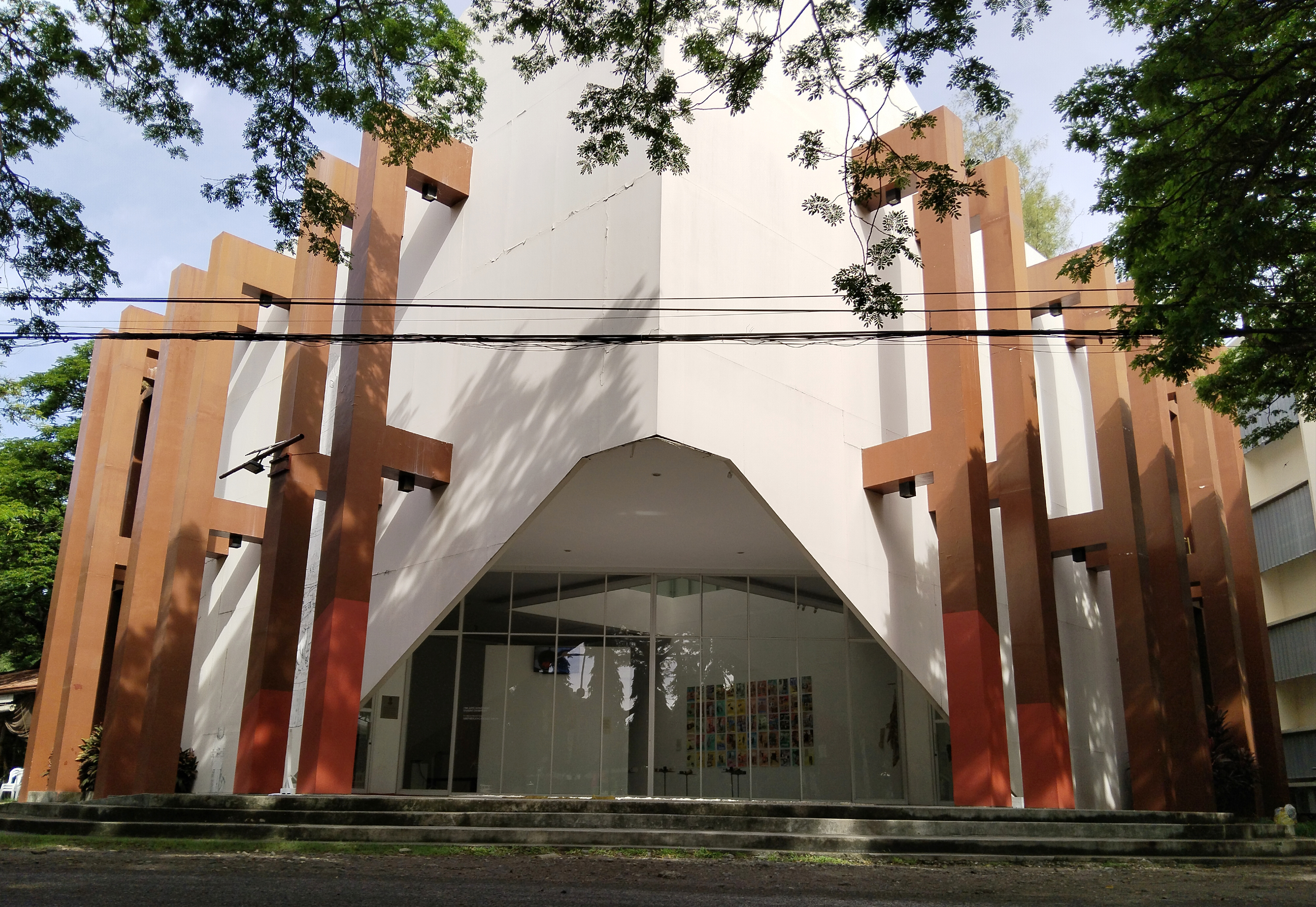
Dr. Romeo P. Ariniego Art Gallery.

There are a number of theaters on the Silliman campus. Foremost is the Claire Isabel McGill Luce Auditorium. Construction of this edifice was commenced in 1973 and completed in the year 1975. The other one is the Audio Visual Theater maintained by the Instructional Media and Technology Center. A third is named as the Woodward Little Theater. The latter is regularly utilized by the Speech and Theater Arts Department.

Silliman also maintains a number of museums. These include the Anthropology Museum now situated at Hibbard Hall, the Heritage Museum at the Silliman Hall, the Gonzales Museum of Natural History at the Science Building, the Marine Mammal Museum of the Institute of Environmental and Marine Sciences (IEMS), the Ariniego Art Gallery, and the SU-ROTC Museum located at the Col. Roman T. Yap Hall.

The Anthropology Museum was relocated from Silliman Hall to Hibbard Hall in 2015. Established in 1973, it was opened to bring the importance of the Filipino's cultural heritage to the attention of the public. The bulk of the artifacts displayed came from fieldworks, excavations, purchases and donations. The museum has seven galleries. The first three, contain exhibits which have been collected from known cultural or ethnic groups all over the country. These items or artifacts include simple tools and instruments such as basketry, agricultural and aquatic tools, weapons, clothing and ornaments as well as musical instruments. The display is based on two general criteria: the type of social organization (incipient, tribal or sultanate) and the type of economic subsistence (hunting, and gathering, marginal agriculture or farming) under which ethnic group is categorized. The exhibit on the last four galleries are artifacts excavated from different parts of Negros Island and in the mountain areas of Cotabato. A number of excavations done by Sillimanian anthropologists in the 1970s yielded ancient artifacts, like burial urns, and porcelain pieces which date back to the Sung period in the twelfth century.

The Heritage Museum which was opened in August 2020 and housed at the Silliman Hall, is a repository with exhibits on the university's history since it was founded in 1901 by the Americans. Collections such as memorabilia and set-ups (e.g. classrooms) on what the life the founders had during the institution's infancy are showcased in the various sections the museum has.

The Gonzales Museum of Natural History is located at the first floor of the Science Complex. It showcases a collection of preserved animals traditionally found in the tropics such as different kinds of fishes, crustaceans, snakes, eagles, birds, flying lemurs, etc. The museum was named in honor Prof. Rodolfo Gonzales, a former biology teacher of the university. The Marine Mammal Museum on the other hand contains a large collection of whale and dolphin bones. It is located at a facility of the Institute of Environmental and Marine Sciences two kilometers north of the main campus. In 2015, the university opened its SU-ROTC Museum located on the first floor of Roman Yap Hall which houses the rare artifacts and equipment used in the Second World War and military uniforms of high-ranking Sillimanian military officials over the years.

=== Zoo ===
The A.Y. Reyes Zoological and Botanical Gardens or the Silliman University Zoo is the university zoo. It is also the home for the Center for Tropical Conservation Studies. The garden started in the 1960s as a tree planting project and field laboratory studies facility by the Silliman University Biology Department. In 1990, it became the country's first captive breeding center for the Philippine Spotted Deer (Rusa alfredi). Since then, the garden's captive breeding program has expanded to include other endangered wildlife unique to the Philippines such as the Critically Endangered Visayan Warty Pig (Sus cebifrons) and the Negros Bleeding-Heart Dove (Gallicolumba keayi). By 1996, the garden had grown to include over twenty animals and twenty-four plant species. The place was named the A.Y. Reyes Zoological and Botanical Garden after the late botanist, Prof. Alfredo Y. Reyes who helped start and develop the garden.

=== Beach ===
Situated on the eastern part of the Institute of Environmental and Marine Sciences is a shoreline that stretches from Bantayan to the Dumaguete Airport locally known as the Silliman Beach. Extension programs like local fishing has been a project to the university and to the local fishermen in Dumaguete.

== Administration ==
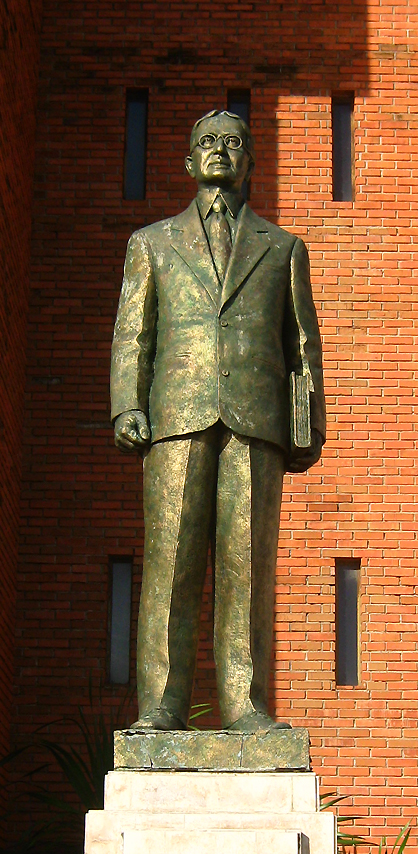
David Sutherland Hibbard. Silliman's founding president.

Presidents of
Silliman University
David S. Hibbard, 1901–1930
Roy H. Brown, 1932–1936
Arthur L. Carson, 1939–1953
Leopoldo T. Ruiz, 1953–1961
Cicero D. Calderon, 1962–1971
Quintin S. Doromal, 1973–1982
Venancio D. Aldecoa Jr., 1983–1986
Pedro V. Flores, 1987–1989
Angel C. Alcala, 1991–1992
Mervyn J. Misajon, 1994–1996
Agustin A. Pulido, 1996–2006
Ben S. Malayang III, 2006–2018^{[a]}
Betty Cernol-McCann, 2018–2026 (term concluding)

Silliman is governed by a Board of Trustees with fifteen members. Five of its members are elected from the Silliman University Foundation Incorporated (SUFI), five from the UCCP, and five from the alumni. The president of the university sits as an ex-officio member. Under the board are members of the administration, including University President, the Vice President for Academic Affairs and Research, Chief Finance Officer, Human Resource Management Chief, University General Counsel and Senior Minister among others.

Academic policies are implemented by the Vice President for Academic Affairs and Research together with various deans, directors, department chairpersons, coordinators, officers and unit heads of the colleges, schools, institutes, units, research centers, offices, programs and extension projects of the university.

Though historically Protestant, the university is academically nonsectarian. Its learning environment has remained generally liberal and its religious orientation has in no way discouraged the expression or exercise of other beliefs. A majority of the university's student and faculty population are Roman Catholics, with a significant portion of Muslims from Mindanao and the Middle East.

== Academics ==
=== Recognition ===
Commission on Higher Education
(CHED) Philippines
National Centers of Excellence (COE)
Information Technology
Nursing
Teacher Education
National Centers of Development (COD)
Biology
Marine Science
Medical Technology

The Commission on Higher Education (Philippines) (CHED) designated Silliman as a Center of Excellence in Information Technology, Teacher Education and Nursing Education, and a Center of Development in Anthropology, Biology, and Medical Technology Aside from these, the university was also named by the United States Agency for International Development as a Center of Excellence in Coastal Resource Management, and by the Haribon Foundation as an Academic Center of Excellence in Biodiversity Conservation. Due to the university's community-based coastal resource management program, Apo Island, a small island off the coast of Dauin, was recognized as one of the best diving spots in the world.

=== Rankings and reputation ===
University rankings

Regional – Overall
- QS Asia: 551-600 (2023) 88 (2023) QS South Eastern Asia

National – Overall
- QS National: 9 (2026)

Silliman is one of few schools in the Philippines that are included in international academic ranking tables. In 2011 it was listed as one of five (5) Philippine schools in the category for Life Sciences and Medicine. It maintained its spot in comparison with other Philippine schools from 2012-2016. It slightly dipped in 2017 in relation to other schools in Asia although still landing 6th among Philippine schools that remained in the list. It ranked 7th in 2020, 5th in 2021, 5th in 2022, and 5th in 2023. In relation to other Asian universities, it ranked 88th in Southeastern Asia, and 551st-600th in the whole of Asia, respectively. It landed 6th among Philippine schools in 2024, and 9th for 2025.

Webometrics, also ranks Silliman among the top schools in the country, landing 13th in 2016 and 9th in 2021. In a non-academic ranking, Silliman was listed by Christian Universities Online as one of the "50 Most Beautiful Christian College and University Campuses in the World". Meanwhile, the university is Top 10 in the Philippines' Best Universities for 2026 by EduRank.

=== International linkages ===
School	Founded
College of Agriculture	1950
College of Arts and Sciences	1909
College of Business Administration	1938
College of Computer Studies	1988
College of Education	1924
College of Engineering and Design	1932
College of Law	1935
College of Mass Communication	1966
College of Nursing	1947
College of Performing and Visual Arts	1912
Institute of Clinical Laboratory Sciences	1970
Institute of Environmental and Marine Sciences	1974
Institute of Rehabilitative Sciences	—
School of Basic Education	1901
Divinity School	1921
School of Public Affairs and Governance	2007
School of Medicine	2004

On top of its strong affiliation with the United Board for Christian Higher Education in Asia (UBCHEA) and other international development organizations, Silliman maintains linkages on collaborative research as well as on faculty and student exchange, with universities in the United States, Asia, and Europe. Its longest running student exchange programs are with three Japanese universities: International Christian University, Ferris University and Shikoku Gakuin University. Silliman also maintains research and academic linkages with the University of Washington (USA), California State University, East Bay (USA), Gordon College (USA), the Smithsonian Institution (USA), Texas Tech University (USA), Old Dominion University (USA), Ritsumeikan Asia Pacific University (Japan), Chonbuk National University (South Korea), Hanshin University (South Korea), Sookmyung Women's University (South Korea), Soongsil University (South Korea), Hanyang University (South Korea), Sam Ratulangi University (Indonesia), the Asian College of Nursing and Health (Malaysia), Hannam University (South Korea), Madras Christian College (India), Kinki University (Japan), and Ingolstadt University of Applied Sciences (Germany).

=== Accreditation ===
Silliman University confers bachelor's, master's, and doctoral degrees accredited by different bodies and agencies such as the ACSCU-AAI, PAASCU (a member of FAAP), and the ATESEA among others.

=== Colleges ===
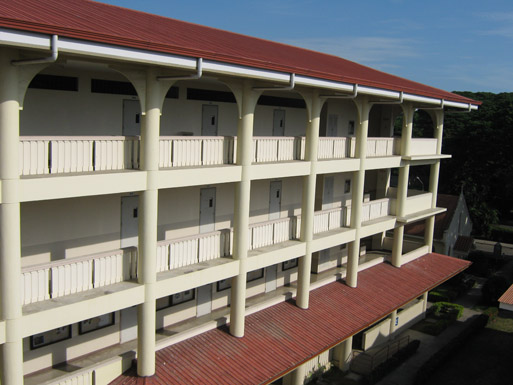
The Dr. Luz Ausejo Hall, College of Arts and Sciences

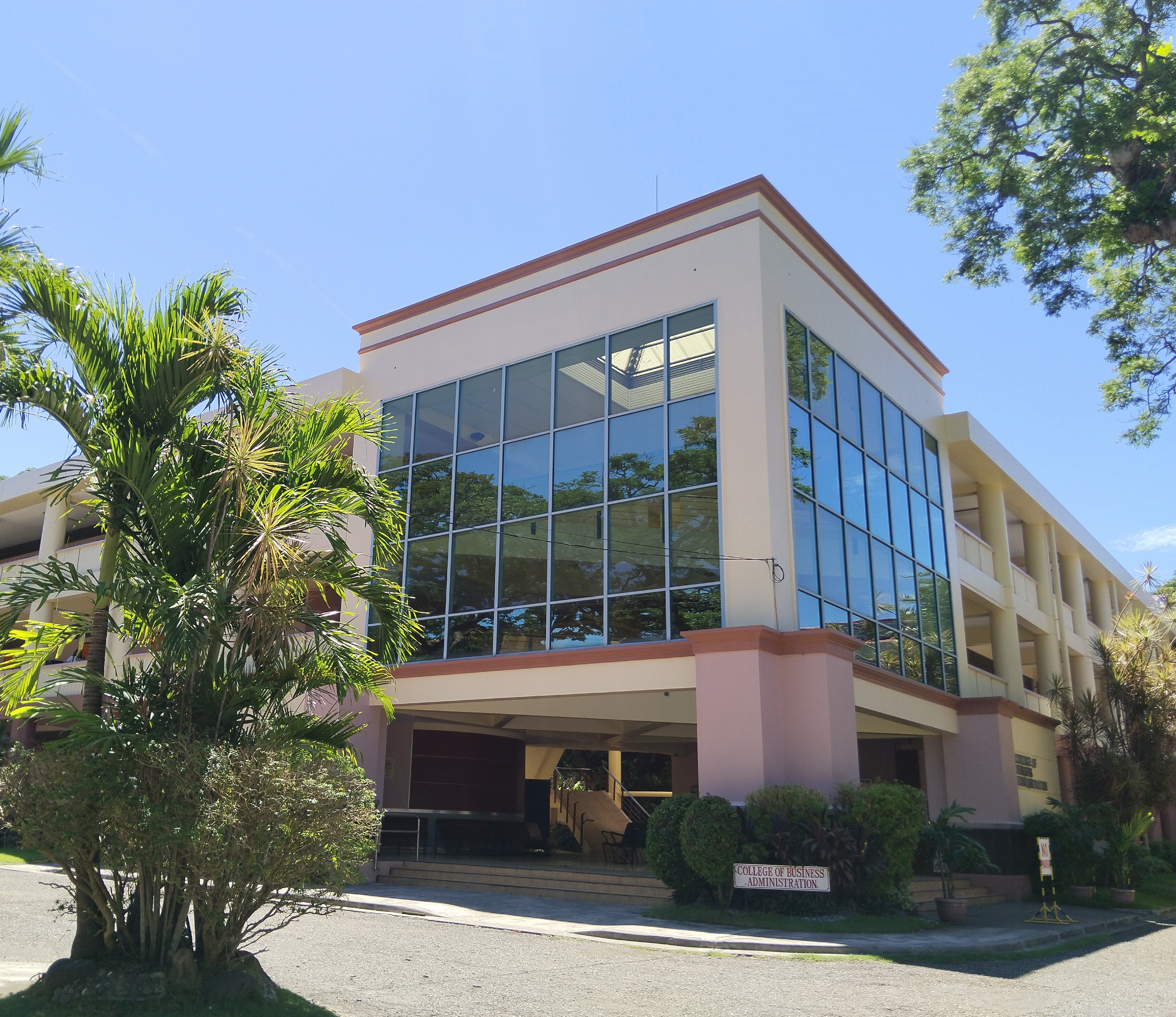
The College of Business Administration Building

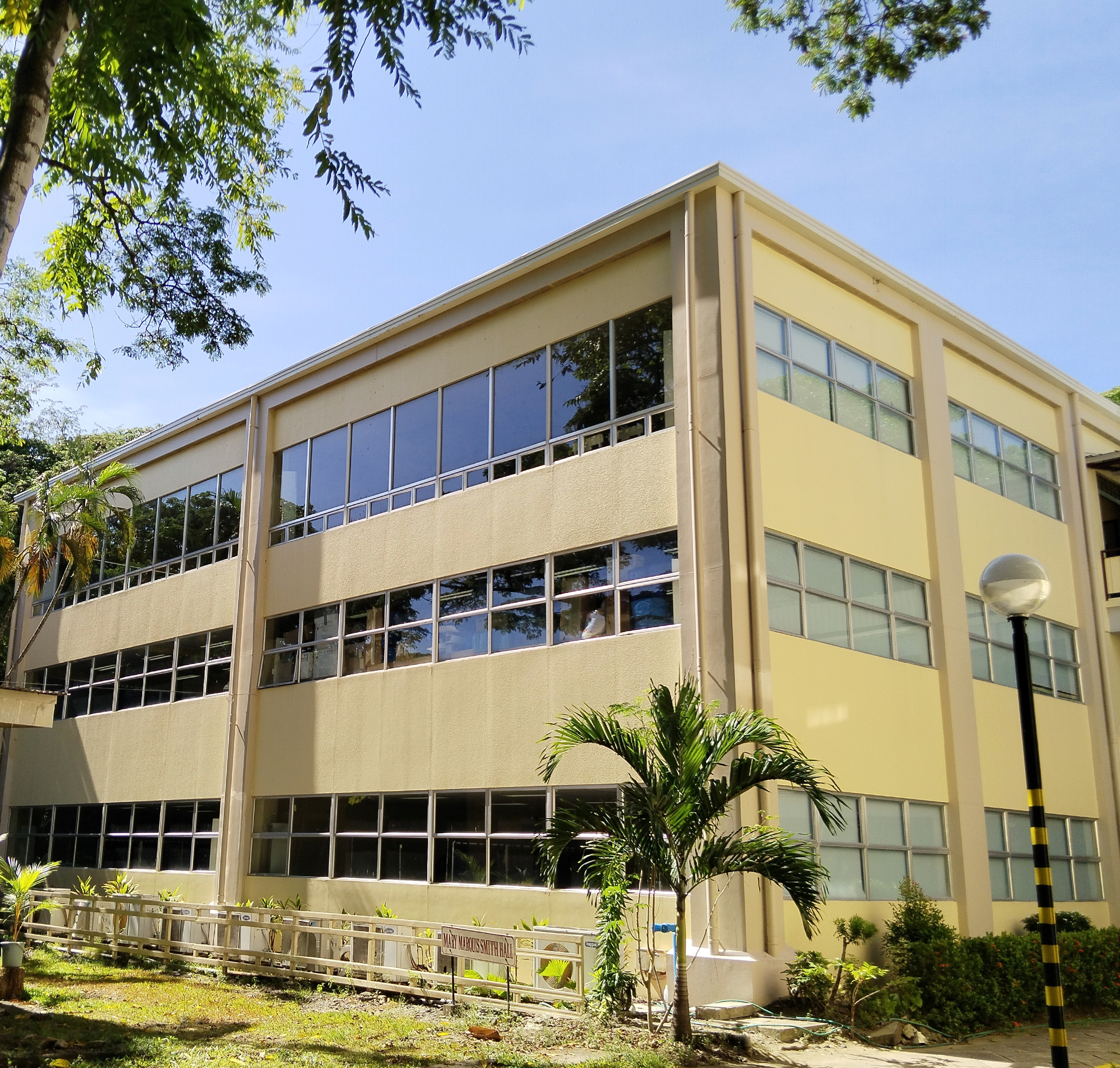
The Mary Marquis Smith Hall, College of Nursing

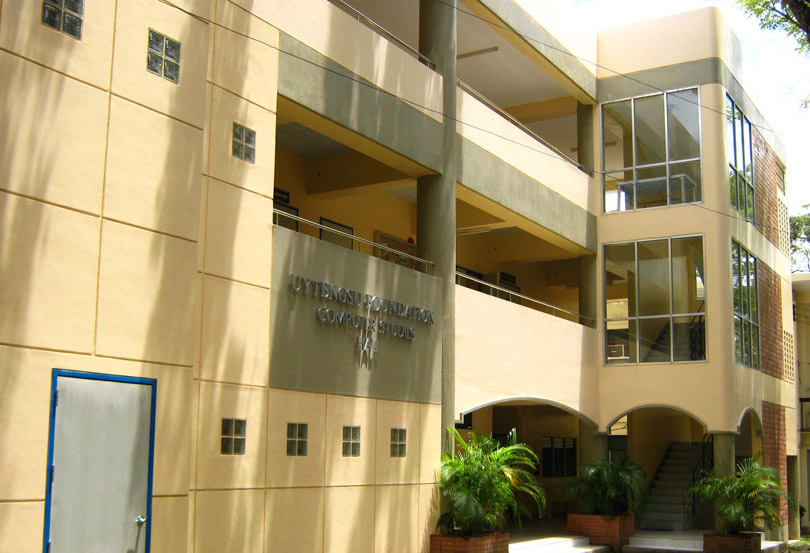
The Uytengsu Foundation Computer Studies Hall of the College of Computer Studies

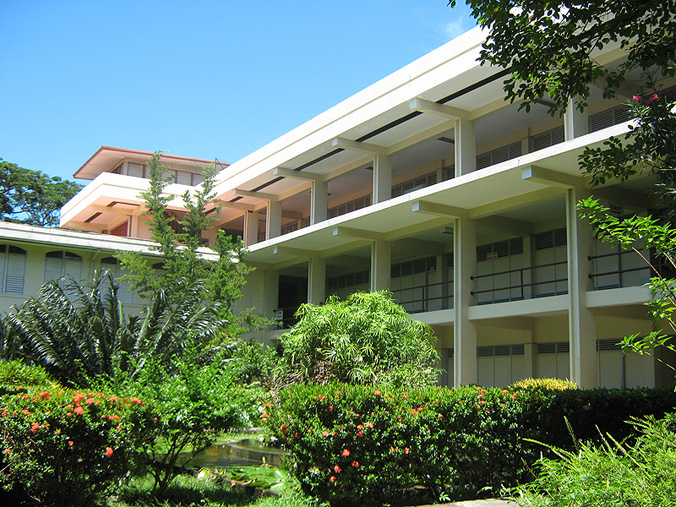
Science Complex

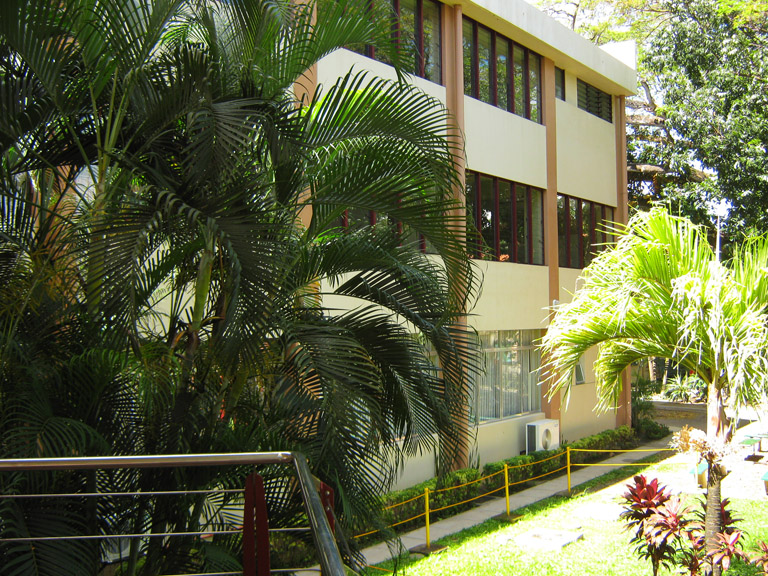
South Wing of the College of Business Administration.

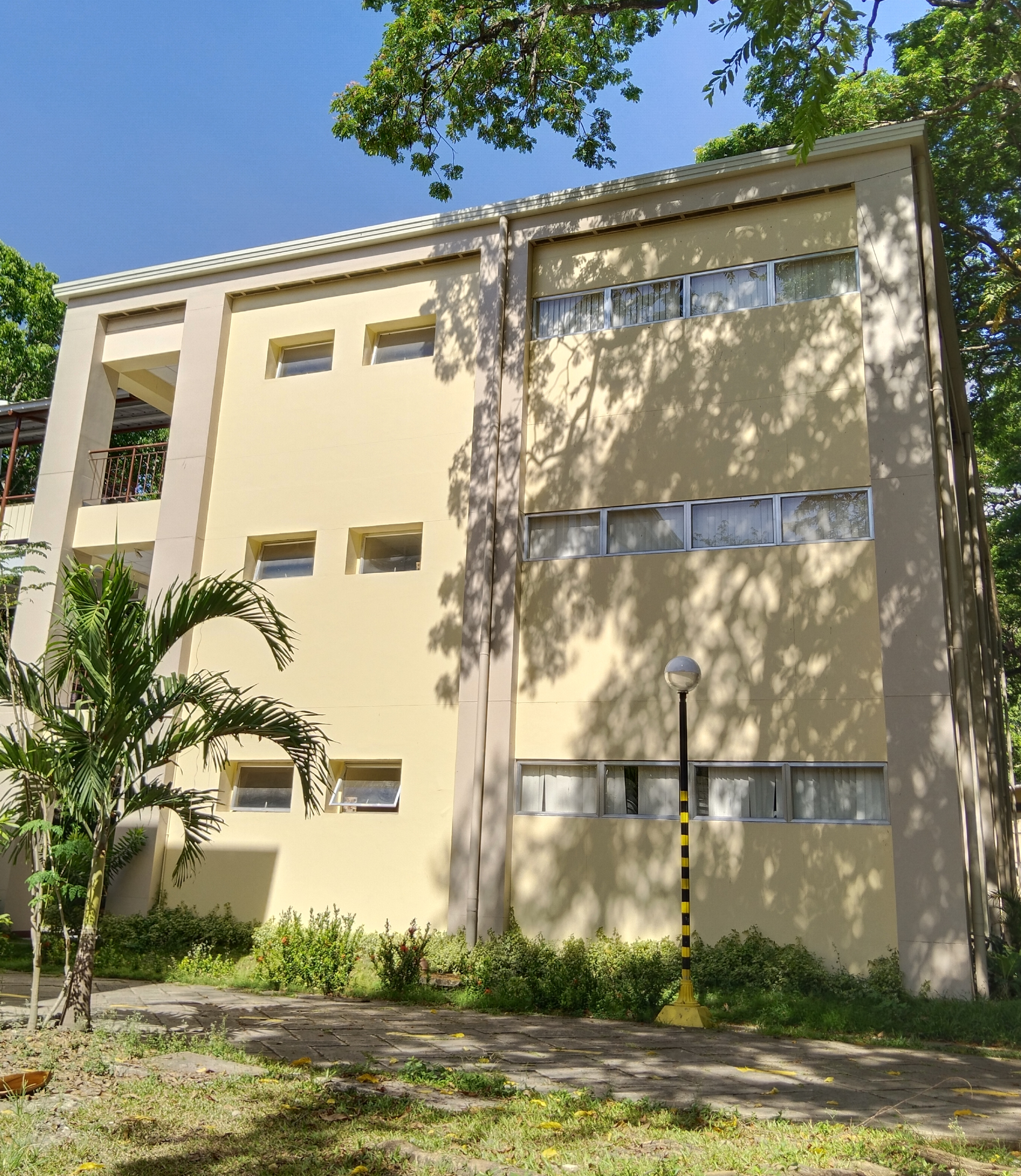
Olivia Villaflores Yanson Hall of the College of Nursing

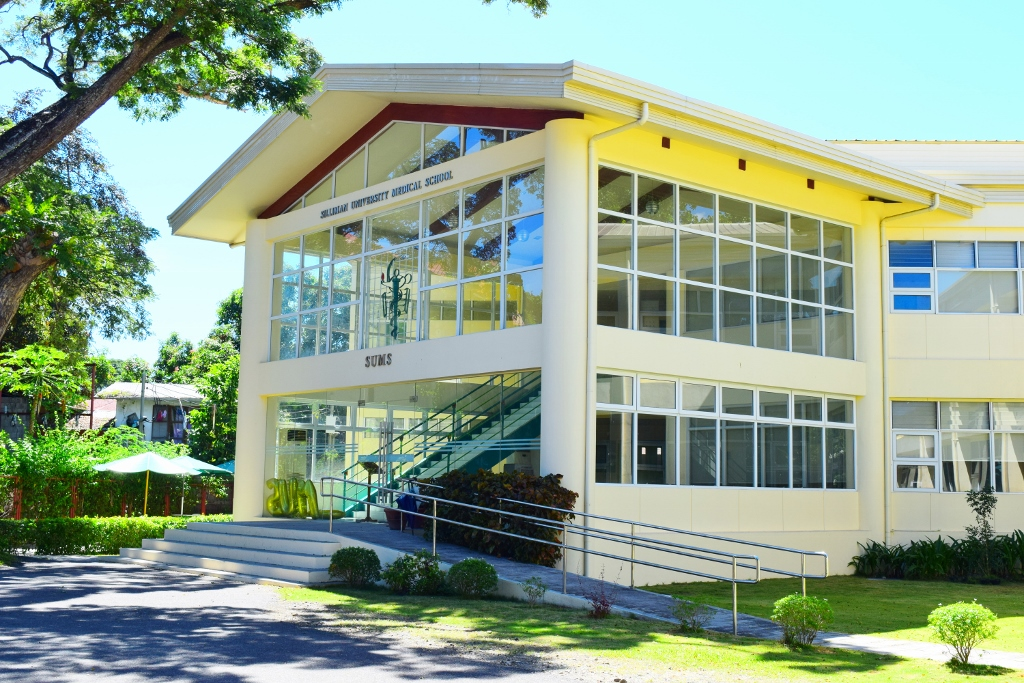
The Medical School Building

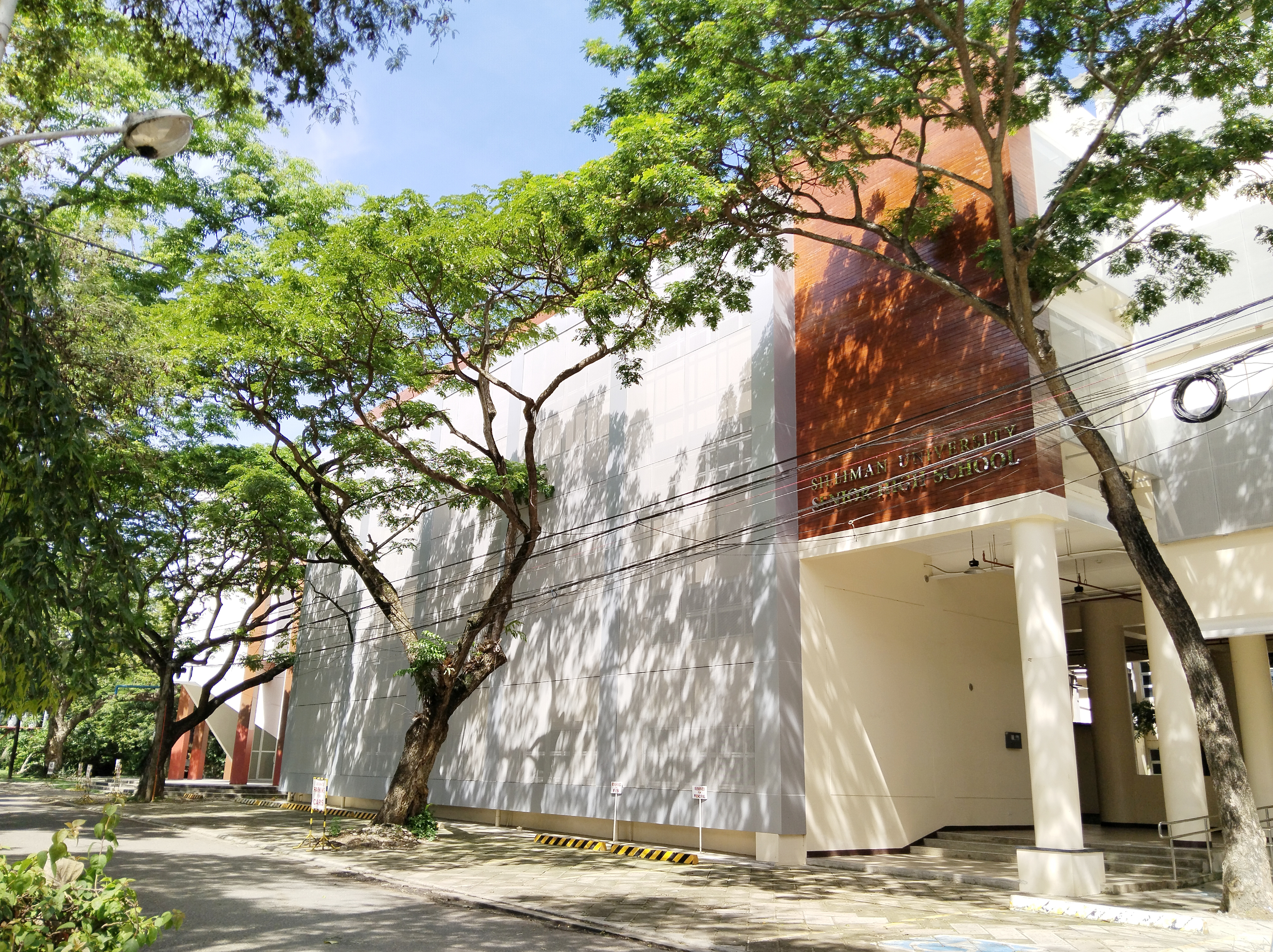
Senior High School Building

- The College of Agriculture provides undergraduate programs in Agribusiness, Agronomy and Animal Science. The college is located in a 29-hectare agricultural complex, two kilometers north of the main campus. Its beginnings can be traced to as early as 1913, when Dr. David S. Hibbard, first president of Silliman Institute, was instructed to make provisions for a "school garden and a farm". In 1950, it was formalized and established as a department, and in 1976, was constituted into what was then known as the School of Agriculture. The years 1977 to 1980 saw the construction of modern classrooms, a laboratory complex, eight dormitories and a library, and the renaming of the school into what is now known as the "College of Agriculture".
- The College of Arts and Sciences provides several degree programs. At present, it is composed of the departments of Anthropology and Sociology, Biology, Chemistry, English and Literature, History and Political Science, Filipino and Foreign Languages, Mathematics, Philosophy and Religion, Physics, Psychology, Social Work Department. During its early years (1902 up to the war years), the College of Arts and Sciences was composed of the College of Liberal Arts and the College of Sciences. In 1947, both colleges were merged to become the College of Arts and Sciences.
- The College of Business Administration provides undergraduate courses in Business Administration (majors in General Business, Management and Economics), Accountancy, Entrepreneurship, Business Computer Applications, and Office Management. It also has one graduate program in Business Administration namely Master in Business Administration. Established as a college in 1938, it is now composed of the departments of Management, Economics, Accountancy, Business Computer Applications, Entrepreneurship, and Commercial Science. Due to its consistently high performance in accountancy board examinations, the college has been designated by CHED as a Center of Development in Accountancy Education. In the October 2009 CPA Licensure Examinations (10–25 examinees category), Silliman ranked second in the country.
- The College of Computer Studies provides undergraduate courses in Computer Science, Information Technology, and Information Systems. The college was designated by CHED as a Center of Excellence in Information Technology Education. In 1997, Silliman was one of only two universities in the Philippines that had an extensive fiber-optic backbone and the only school in the country that owned its fiber-optic system. Costing US $2.5 million in 1997, it connected all buildings in the campus. Silliman was also the first school in the country to use wireless Wi-Fi B2B LAN technology. It opened its master's degree in Information Systems, and pilot tested the Silliman Online University Learning (SOUL) website, a virtual classroom for students. It also formed partnerships with Microsoft and IBM. The Microsoft Developer Network Academic Alliance gave the college a 3-year complimentary MSDNAA subscription which allowed it to download available software in MSDNAA for free to all students and faculty for teaching and learning purposes, while the college's partnership with IBM resulted in the introduction of the IBM Academic Exchange Offering. Electives under the program were developed for junior and graduating students majoring in Information Technology, Information Systems and Computer Science.
- The College of Engineering and Design started as a Department of Engineering in June 1932, offering an undergraduate program in civil engineering. In March 1935, the board of trustees authorized the change in status of Silliman from an institute to a university. With government approval of this change, Silliman proceeded to adopt additional undergraduate programs in mining engineering, chemical engineering and industrial engineering. Today, the college offers five undergraduate courses in: architecture, civil engineering; computer engineering; electrical engineering; and mechanical engineering. In the October 2009 Mechanical Engineering Licensure Examinations (Category A), Silliman was ranked second in the country.
- The College of Education has been designated by CHED as Center of Excellence in Teacher Education. The college has three departments: Physical Education, Teacher Education, and Nutrition and Dietetics. Its beginnings can be traced way back in 1924 when it first offered diplomas in Bachelor of Science in education. From then on, the Teacher Education Program grew and developed into what is now known as the College of Education.
- The College of Law was established in 1935, starting with a freshman class of 22 members. It is housed at the Villareal Hall, named after former Speaker of the House Cornelio Villareal. The college has chosen the motto "Law with a Conscience." It is also home to the Dr. Jovito R. Salonga Center for Law and Development. Starting SY 2009–2010, the college shifted its course offering from Bachelor of Laws (LLB) to Juris Doctor (JD). Silliman is the first law school to offer the JD program in the Visayas and Mindanao area.
- The College of Mass Communication was established in 1966 as the first school outside of metropolitan Manila to offer a degree program in Journalism. Its founding director was D. Wayne Rowland, Ph.D., a visiting professor in journalism from Texas Christian University. In 1976, the college (then known as the School of Communication) changed its course offering from a bachelor's degree in Journalism to that of Mass Communication to cover the ever-expanding field of mass communication.
- The College of Nursing was designated by CHED as a Center of Excellence in Nursing Education. The college offers one undergraduate course in Nursing and three graduate courses namely: (1) Master in Nursing [non-thesis] Majors in Family Nursing Practice, Administration, Public Health Nursing, Adult Health and Psychiatric-Mental Health Nursing; (2) Master of Science in Nursing Majors in Parent-Child Nursing, Nursing School Administration, Nursing Service Administration, Public Health Nursing, Medical Surgical Nursing, Psychiatric-Mental Nursing, Family Nursing Practice, Community Health Nursing and Adult Health; and (3) Ph.D. in Nursing. Founded in 1947, the college is known for its ratings in the professional licensure exams which have been consistently higher than the national average. In a 2009 report handed down by CHED, Silliman was ranked first in the country.
- The College of Performing and Visual Arts provides programs in Fine Arts, Music, and Speech & Theater Arts. The college started in 1912 as a music department in the College of Arts and Sciences. With the arrival of American missionary Geraldine Kate in 1934, it was renamed as the Conservatory of Music, with Kate as its founding director. In 1941, it became known as the School of Music, and with the addition of the Fine Arts Department in 1969, was recast as the School of Music and Fine Arts. Another transformation came in 2001 when its name was changed to the College of Performing Arts.

=== Schools ===
- The Divinity School provides undergraduate and graduate programs in Divinity, Ministry and Theology. It started in 1921 as the Silliman Bible School, serving as a Congregationalist-Presbyterian training school for Visayan-speaking candidates in pastoral ministry. Its students and alumni are a diverse group of local and international students.
- The Medical School opened in 2004 with a faculty of 50 medical doctors specializing in Rheumatology, Anesthesiology, Cardiology, Endocrinology, Eye-Ear-Nose-Throat, Family Medicine Gastroenterology, General Surgery, Hematology, Infectious Diseases, Internal Medicine, Nephrology, Neurology, Neuro-Surgery, Nuclear Medicine, Obstetrics and Gynecology, Oncology, Orthopedic Surgery, Pediatrics, Psychiatry, Public Health Administration, Pulmonary Medicine, Rehabilitation Medicine, and Urology.
- The School of Public Affairs and Governance opened in June 2007, with Dr. Reynaldo Y. Rivera as the first dean, to provide formal training in the management of local government affairs. It specializes in three areas: Fiscal Administration, Local Governance, and Criminal Justice System; and offers two degree programs, Public Administration (BSPA) and Foreign Affairs (BSFA). The School aims to beef up the expertise of public servants to become more efficient administrators who can discharge their duties in the most economical way with maximum results. A distinguished panel of guest lecturers from Manila and abroad join the resident faculty of Silliman in teaching the courses.
- The School of Basic Education is home to three departments: Early Childhood, Elementary, and High School. When Silliman Institute (former name of Silliman University) was founded in 1901, it started as an elementary school; thus, making the Elementary Department the oldest unit in the university. In 1916, the first high school diplomas were awarded, and in 1957–58, funding for an Early Childhood School building was secured. Historically, the Early Childhood, Elementary and High School departments operated separately. Due to developments within the university in 2001, however, and to facilitate better coordination between these departments, the early childhood, elementary, and high schools, were merged as one unit, forming what is now known as the School of Basic Education.
- The School of Agro-Industrial and Technical Education provides short TESDA-accredited technical-vocational certificate courses. These courses are generally sponsored through scholarship grants from government agencies such as TESDA and DepEd.

=== Institutes ===
- The Institute of Clinical Laboratory Sciences offers one undergraduate course in Medical Technology. The Institute started as a program under the Biology Department of the College of Arts and Sciences in 1970. Due to the growth of its student population, exemplary performance in licensure examinations and need for autonomy, it was separated and constituted as a department under the same college in 1987, making it into a Department of Medical Technology. In 1995, the university reorganized some of its programs and transferred the Medical Technology department to the College of Nursing, creating a new college named College of Nursing and Allied Health Sciences. Starting SY 2009–2010 however, in a bid to give the department more autonomy, it was separated from the College of Nursing and renamed as the Institute of Clinical Laboratory Sciences.
- The Institute of Rehabilitative Sciences provides one undergraduate course in Physical Therapy. Like the Medical Technology Department, the institute started as a program under the College of Arts and Sciences. It was subsequently migrated to the College of Nursing together with the Medical Technology Department, forming a new college, the College of Nursing and Allied Health Sciences. For over a decade, the Physical Therapy program was attached to the College of Nursing and Allied Health Sciences. In School Year 2009-2010, it was separated and reconstituted as the Institute of Rehabilitative Sciences.

=== Library system ===
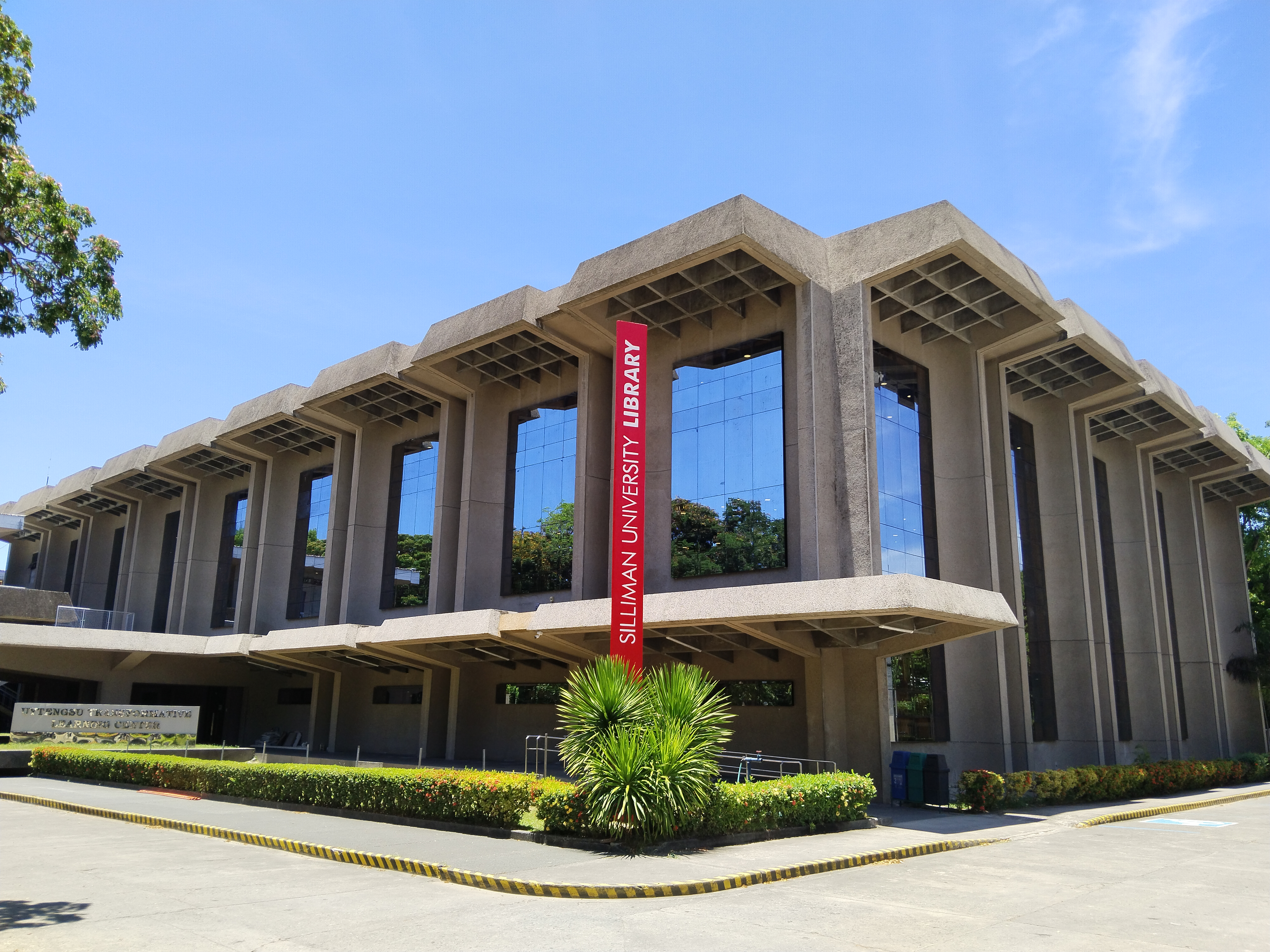
The Robert B. and Metta J. Silliman Library^{[b]}

The Silliman Library System is composed of the Robert B. and Metta J. Silliman Library, which serves as the university library, and the local libraries of the College of Agriculture, College of Business Administration, College of Law, the Divinity School, the Allied Health Sciences, High School, Elementary and Early Childhood Schools. Among these libraries the Robert B. and Metta J. Silliman Library (university library) serves as the largest repository of books, periodicals and other reading materials. Built in 1978, the university library is a four-story structure with a seating capacity of 490 readers. It holds over 250,000 volumes.

The university library is likewise home to externally-funded centers: the American Studies Resource Center (ASRC) and a World Bank Knowledge for Development Center (WB-KDC). The American Studies Resource Center is a result of a memorandum of agreement between the United States Embassy in Manila and Silliman University. It is the only ASRC in Region VII hosted by an academic institution.

The World Bank Knowledge for Development Center is a result of a partnership between the university and the World Bank. It contains an extensive collection of development publications and World Bank project documents to people involved in the academe, researchers, NGOs, media, government agencies and the business sector. The section is open to the public.

To date, the Silliman Library remains as one of the biggest libraries in the Philippines. In 2008, the Silliman University Library System was given the "Outstanding Library Award" by the Philippine Association of Academic and Research Librarians (PAARL) for its growing collection and ongoing computerization program.

The university recently received a grant from the Uytengsu Foundation, Inc. for the library's renovation recreating it as a digital learning center that features "hybrid & remote access, personalized research assistance, digital well-tech hub, borrowing beyond books, knowledge curation services, community & collaborative spaces, and an immersive hub."

=== Medical Center ===
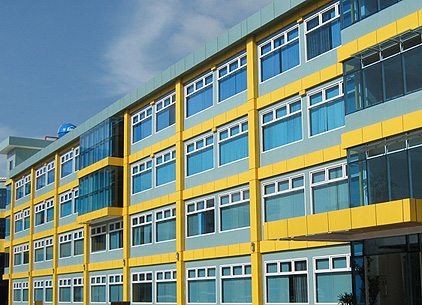
Medical Arts Building of the Silliman University Medical Center.

The Silliman University Medical Center is a university-owned hospital that is currently being operated and managed by the Silliman University Medical Center Foundation Inc. (SUMCFI), a separate and distinct foundation with its own Board of Directors. The hospital supports the academic institution by serving as the university's base facility for the internship programs of the College of Nursing, School of Medicine, the Institutes of Clinical Laboratory and Rehabilitative Sciences, the Divinity School (for its chaplaincy program), and the Nutrition and Dietetics Department.

It is a 140-bed hospital located on campus with comprehensive medical services available to both the university and the community in general. The SU Medical Center started as an infirmary in 1901 and later became a hospital in 1923. In 1974, the cornerstone for a New Medical Center was laid down by the Netherlands Ambassador to the Philippines to commence the building of a four-storey structure with passenger elevators (the first in Negros Oriental). Inaugurated in 1976, it is considered as one of the most modern hospitals outside Metro Manila and Cebu. In 1979, the Medical Center made history when its Van Houweling Research Laboratory discovered and produced a dog vaccine that gave a three-year immunity from rabies. The development of the vaccine was later used by other countries, in collaboration with the World Health Organization, on their fight against rabies. Recently, a new Medical Arts Building was added to the main structure of the hospital to further address the growing needs of the surrounding community. The SU Medical Center has collaborative ties with St. Luke's Medical Center.

=== Research and extension ===
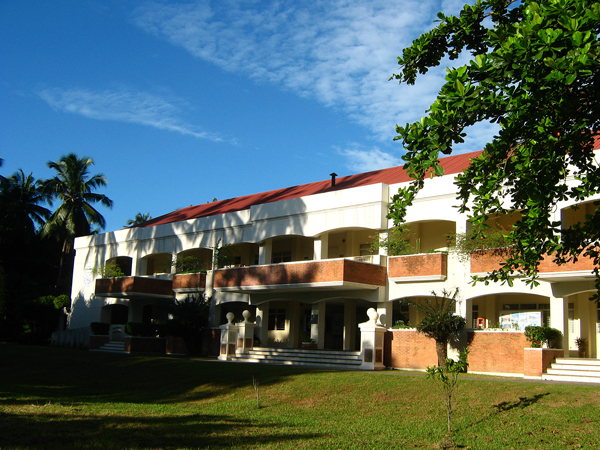
Silliman's Institute of Environmental and Marine Sciences (IEMS) has been designated by the USAID as a Center of Excellence in Coastal Resource Management, and recognized by the CHED as the best research program in the country.

Concurrent with its academic undertakings, the university is engaged in collaborative research and community extension programs. From 2000 to 2011, it has been designated as a CHED Zonal Research Center for Region VII, and in 2011, was chosen by the Commission on Higher Education (CHED) as one of few academic institutions to comprise a national research network which entitles the university to receive an annual allocation of P10 million for a three-year period.

Selected researches are published in the Silliman Journal, the university's research publication. Foremost among the university's research outputs are those that have been undertaken in the field of Environmental and Marine Sciences, historically spearheaded by the Silliman University Marine Laboratory (SUML) now the Institute of Environmental and Marine Sciences (IEMS). IEMS is a research institute in the field of marine sciences located at Silliman Beach, two kilometers north of the main campus. Established in 1974 through a modest grant from the United Church of Canada, it has produced notable research that are presently being applied in various cooperative projects in different local communities, such as the conservation programs in Sumilon and Apo Island. This research institute also led in the establishment of 20 marine protected areas (MPAs) and has provided assistance to 61 others in the Visayas and Mindanao. For its research and biodiversity conservation efforts, it was recognized by the Commission on Higher Education as the best in research program in the country. In July 2013, Greenpeace an international environmental organization partnered with Silliman University in conducting a reef check at Apo Island to determine the damage on the reef caused by climate change.

Other units engaged in either research or extension include the Center for Gender Studies and Development; the Center for Tropical Conservation Studies (CENTROP); the Salonga Center for Law and Development; and the SU-Angelo King Center for Research and Environmental Management (SUAKCREM).

Extension projects of the university also include the SU-Affiliated Non-Conventional Energy Center (SU-ANEC); the SU-KNH Kaugmaran Child Development Center (SUKCDC); the Alternative Lifestyle for Women in Negros Project; H. Capability Program (CBP) for the Province of Negros Oriental; HIV-AIDS Prevention Project; the Marina Clinic Outreach Program, Rural Development and Credit Program (On Monitoring); and the SU-AADC Integrated Agro-Forestry Participatory Program for Negros Oriental (On Monitoring).

== Culture and traditions ==
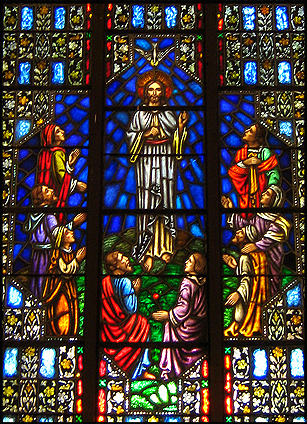
Stained glass window of Silliman University Church depicting Jesus Christ and his apostles

=== Silliman Song ===
Before the end of an event or ceremony the Silliman Song is sung by the attendees. The lyrics were written in 1918 by Dr. Paul Doltz, then the vice-president of Silliman Institute and pastor of Silliman Church. The song is an adaptation of The Orange and the Black of Princeton University, Dr. Doltz's alma mater. The song utilizes the tune of Orange and the Black but with the lyrics written by Doltz. Sang by the Silliman community for almost a hundred years, the Silliman Song has popularized the phrases "Dear old Silliman" and "Silliman beside the sea".

Orange and the Black was written by Clarence Mitchell, Class of 1889, to a tune arranged by Ernest Carter, Class of 1888.

== Student life ==
=== Athletics ===
Silliman has several athletic facilities. The university Gymnasium is a multipurpose facility used for basketball, volleyball, badminton, rock-climbing, table-tennis, cheering, and other indoor activities. The Cimafranca Ballfield is primarily used for football, and for track and field events. Other athletic facilities include an Olympic-sized swimming pool, tennis courts, pelota courts, and an archery range.

Silliman has varsity teams for almost every major sport. A regular participant of the Philippine University Games (UniGames) and the Private Schools Athletic Association (PRISAA), Silliman is represented by a red and white Stallion or Mare. In the recent Beijing Olympics, Mark Javier, a Sillimanian, represented the Philippines in the field of Archery. He was the lone male archer that represented the country. Other notable Philippine Olympians that came from Silliman include Jennifer Chan, who recently won a gold medal in the 25th SEA Games, Lisa Ygnalaga, and long jumper Simeon Toribio.

=== Student government ===
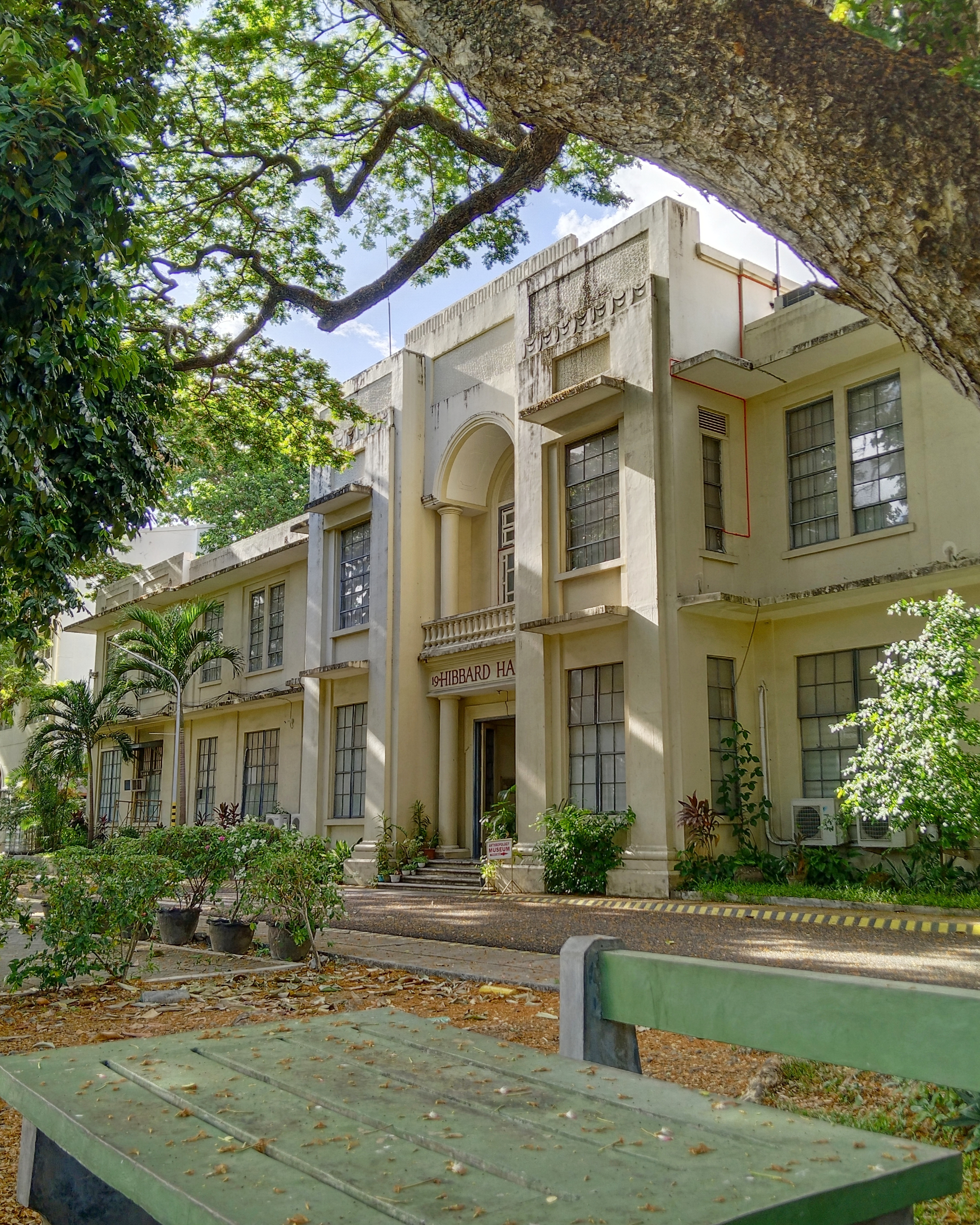
Built in 1932, the Hibbard Hall houses the Office of the University Registrar.

The Silliman University Student Government (SUSG) traces its origins to 1912. Its existence was interrupted in World War II and briefly suspended during Martial Law. As presently structured, it is divided into three branches: the executive, the legislative, and the judicial departments. The executive power is exercised by the President with the assistance of the Cabinet. The Cabinet is composed of the President, Vice President and the respective heads of the executive committee who are appointed by the President. The legislative power of the SUSG is vested in the Student Assembly. It is composed of elected representatives of the different schools and colleges. The Judiciary exercises judicial power. It is composed of the Prime Justice, who must be a junior Law student, and six other justices appointed by the President upon the recommendation of the Committee on Appointments. Election of Student Government officers are held before the close of the academic year.

Currently, there are two student political parties in the university, the Students' Union for Reforms (SURE) Party and the Concerted Action for the Upliftment of Student Endeavors (CAUSE) Party, established in 1980 and 1981, respectively.

The Student Government is under the supervision and oversight of the Student Organizations and Activities Division (SOAD).

=== Student publications ===
Student publications include the Weekly Sillimanian, one of the first weekly student newspaper in the country, with its existence dating back as early as 1903; the Portal, official yearbook, first published in 1913; the Dark Blue Southern Seas, a literary journal published in cooperation with the Department of English; the Junior Sillimanian, a publication of students from the High School Department; and the Stones and Pebbles, a publication of students from the Elementary School. In addition to the Silliman Law Journal, the College of Law in partnership with the Salonga Law Center maintains its own publication called the Purple Map, a legal discussion platform for law students which was started in 2010.

Most of these publications, particularly the Weekly Sillimanian, the Portal, Junior Sillimanian and the Stones and Pebbles are supported by the students through a publication fee; the Purple Map is maintained by way of endowments from law alumni.

== Alumni ==
There are currently forty alumni chapters throughout the world that are duly organized and recognized. Five of these are based in the U.S. and Canada. Notable alumni of the university include Carlos P. Garcia, eighth President of the Philippines; Senators Robert Barbers, Lorenzo Teves, and the Great Filibuster Roseller Lim; House Speaker Cornelio Villareal; John Gokongwei Sr., a Philippine business magnate; Frederick Dael, former CEO and President of Pepsi Cola Asia Pacific, and former CEO of Islacom; William Torres, "Father of Philippine Internet" and co-founder of Mozaic Corporation; Vicente Sinco, one of the signatories of the UN Charter in 1945, the eighth President of the University of the Philippines, and founder of Foundation University; MacArthur Corsino, former Philippine Ambassador to the Republic of Cuba; Antonio P. Villamor, former Philippine Ambassador to the Kingdom of Saudi Arabia; Jose Apolinario Lozada, former Philippine Ambassador to the Vatican, Juanita Amatong, former Secretary of the Department of Finance and first woman executive director in the World Bank Group from the Philippines; Angel Alcala, Ramon Magsaysay Awardee for Public Service and former Secretary of the Department of Environment and Natural Resources, Leonor M. Briones, former National Treasurer of the Republic of the Philippines; Emilio Macias II, former Governor of Negros Oriental; Efren N. Padilla, executive director, Center for Filipino Studies California State University, East Bay; Jose Andrada, first commanding officer of the Philippine Navy (formerly Off Shore Patrol) under the Philippine Commonwealth in 1939 and after whom the Headquarters of the Philippine Navy is now named; Edith L. Tiempo, National Artist for Literature (1999); Edilberto K. Tiempo, Filipino writer, professor and founder of the Silliman National Writers Workshop., Eddie S. Romero, National Artist for Cinema and Broadcast Arts (2003); Leoncio P. Deriada, Palanca Awards Hall of Famer; César Ruiz Aquino, Filipino poet and fictionist; Simeon Toribio, one of few Filipinos who won medals in the history of world Olympics. In nursing, Job Marconi Mascardo received the 2026 American Association for Men in Nursing/DAISY Foundation Health Equity Award.

Sillimanians have also excelled in the field of journalism such as Claire Delfin of GMA Network and Ina Reformina of ABS-CBN; while there are those who entered showbusiness such as Bret Jackson, Beauty Gonzalez, and Theodore Boborol.

Notable Silliman alumni include:

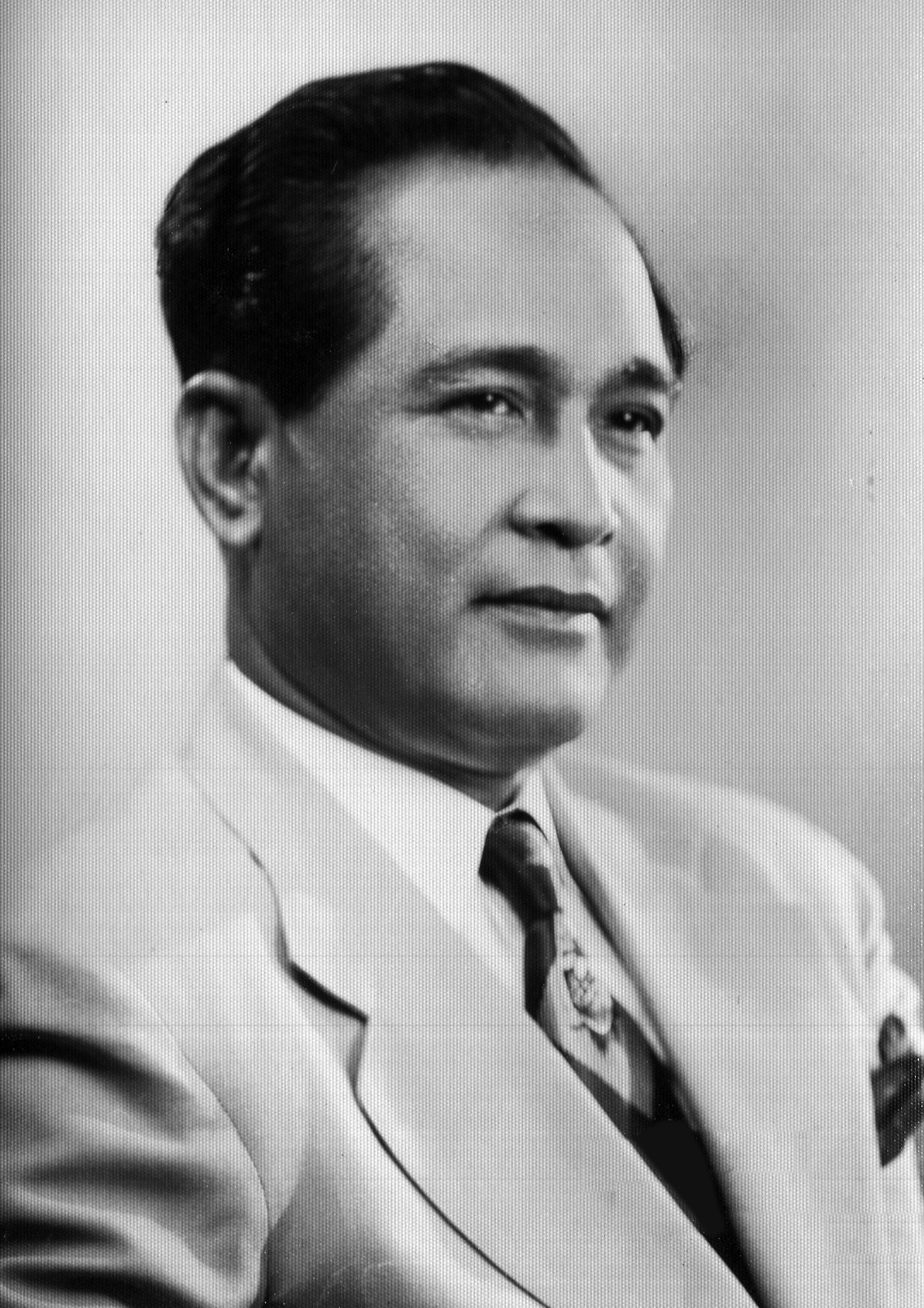
Carlos P. Garcia, eighth President of the Philippines and author of the "Filipino First Policy"

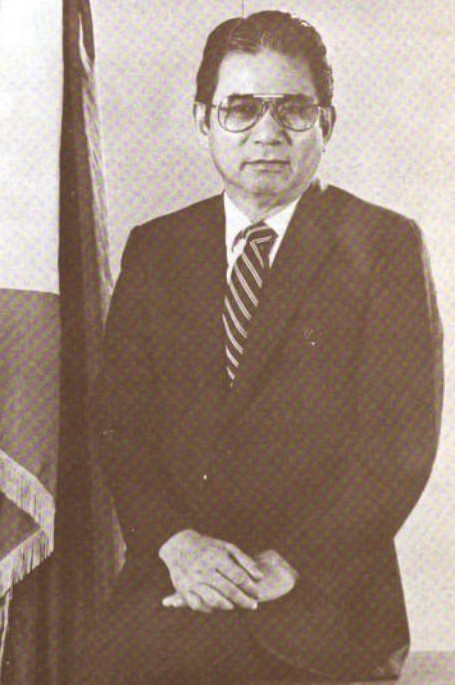
Edelmiro Amante, Executive Secretary of Philippine President Fidel Ramos.

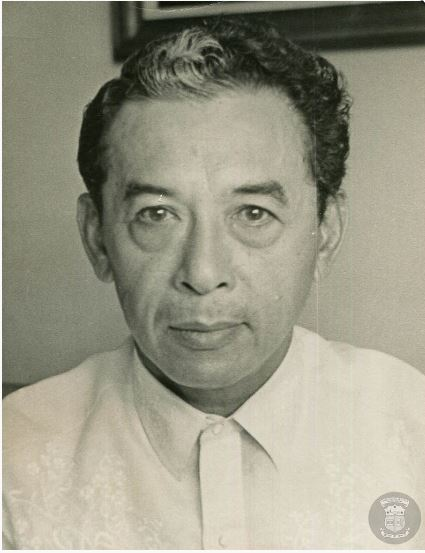
Roseller Lim, Senator of the Philippines.

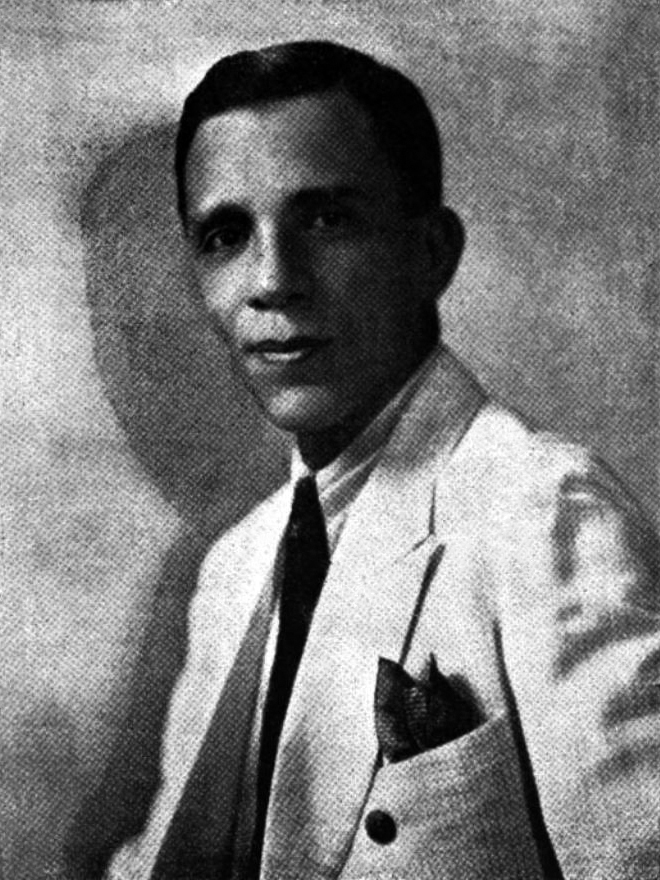
Jose E. Romero, first Philippine Ambassador to the Court of St. James's, United Kingdom.

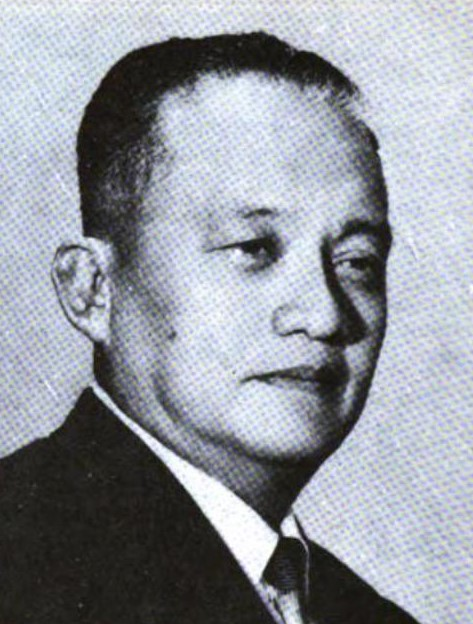
Nicanor Yñiguez, Speaker, Batasang Pambansa.

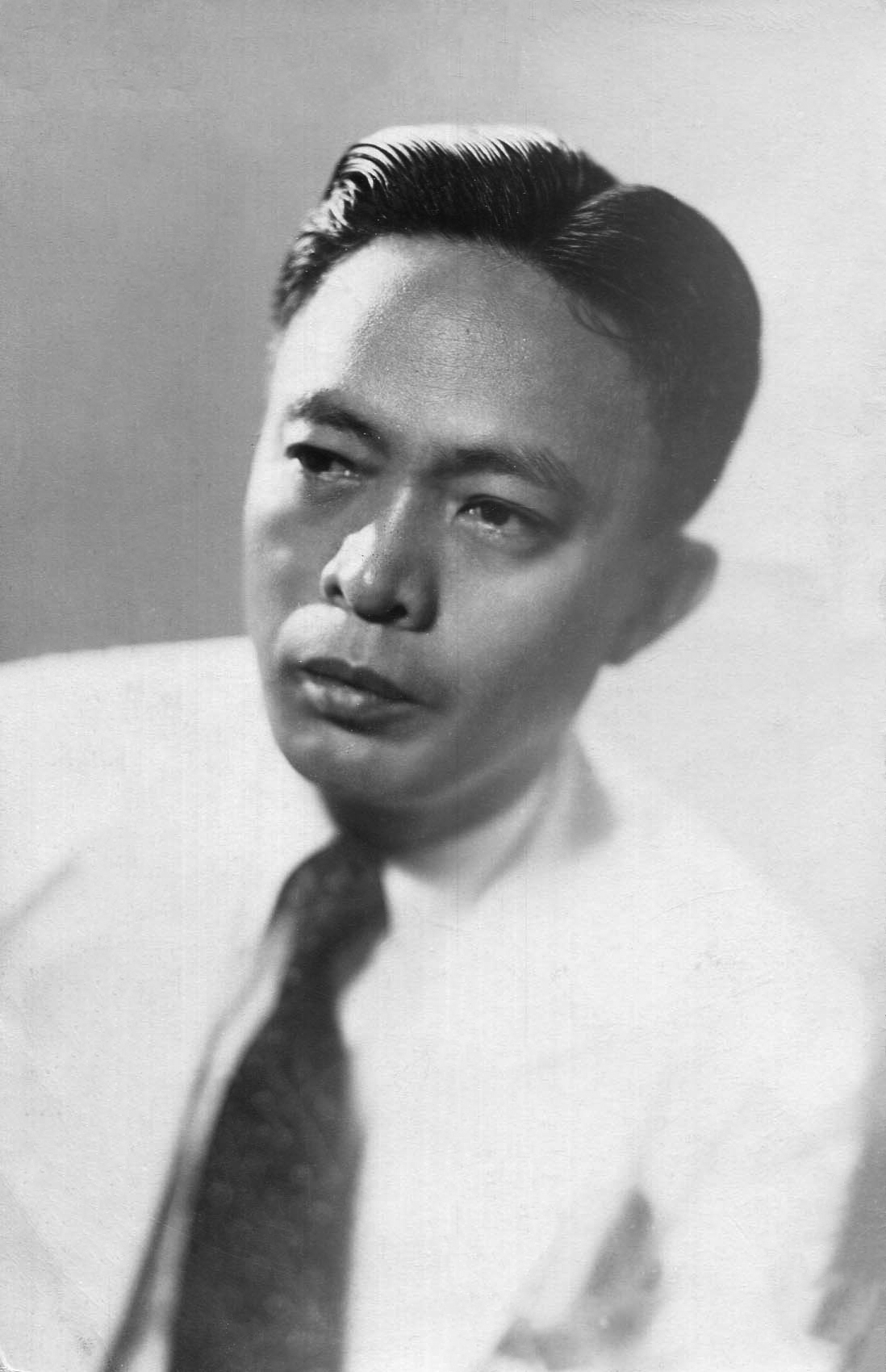
Cornelio Villareal, Speaker of the House of Representatives of the Philippines.

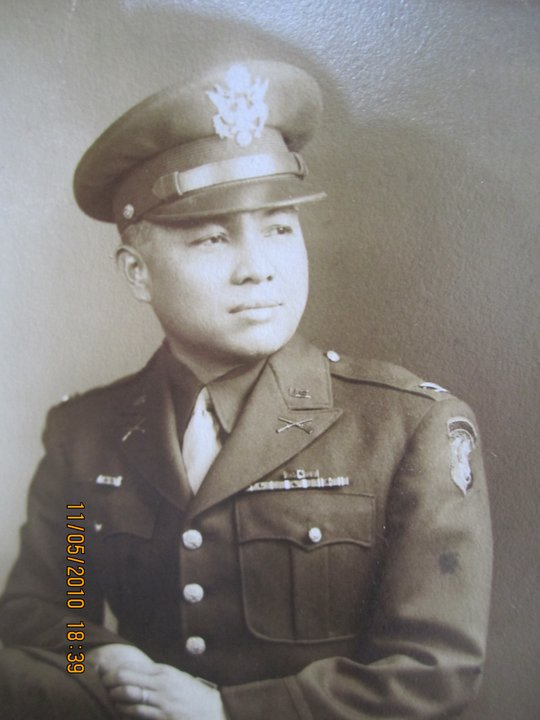
Tomas Cabili, Senator of the Philippines and Secretary of National Defense and Communications.

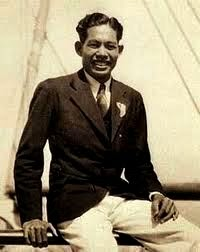
Simeon Toribio, Filipino bronze medalist at the 1932 Summer Olympics in Los Angeles, California.

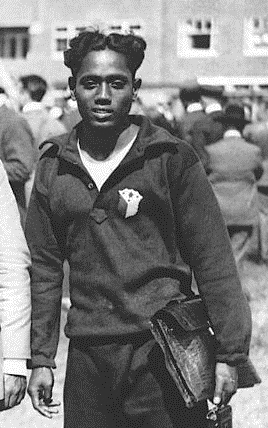
Anselmo Gonzaga, Gold Medalist, 1927 Far Eastern Games.

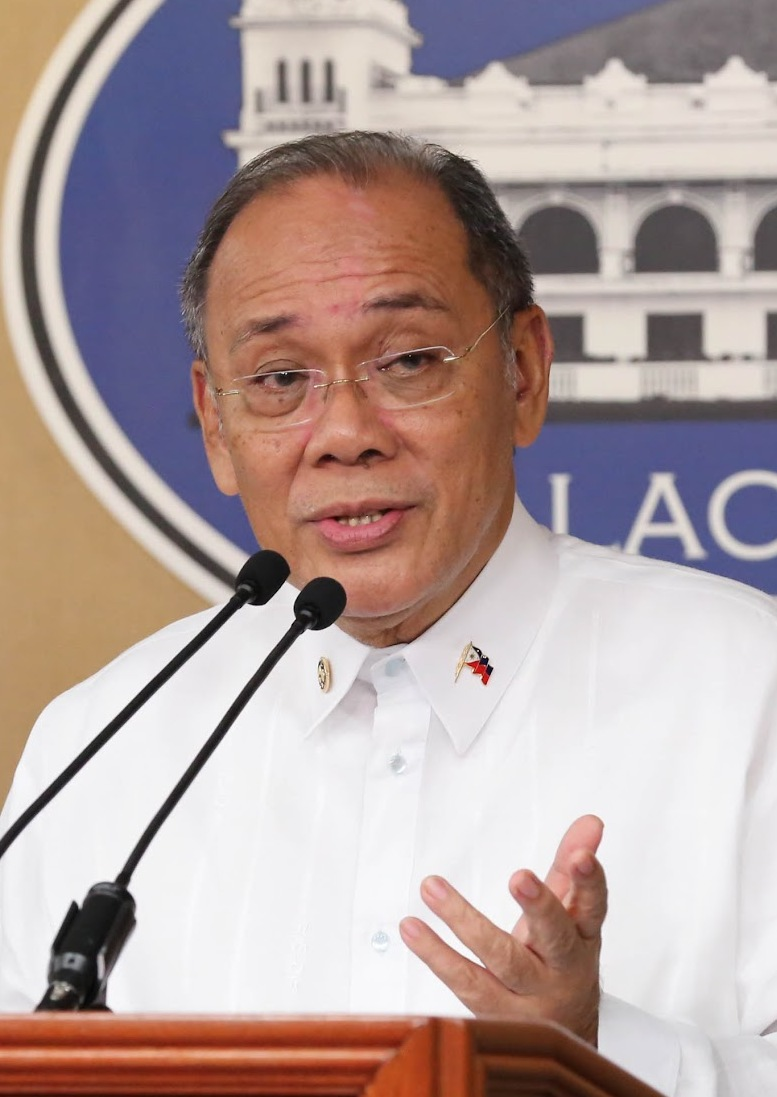
Ernesto Abella, Presidential Spokesperson for Philippine President Rodrigo Duterte.

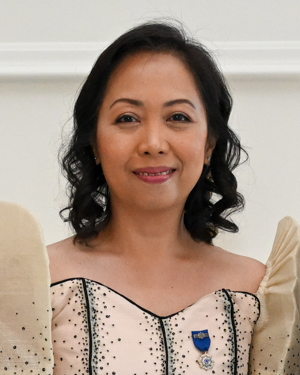
Kira Danganan-Azucena, Philippine Ambassador to New Zealand

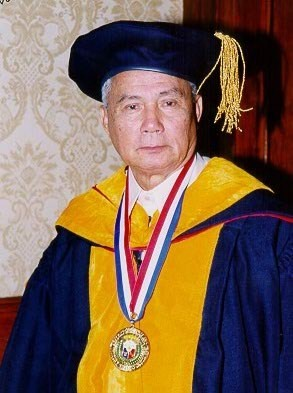
Angel Alcala, National Scientist.

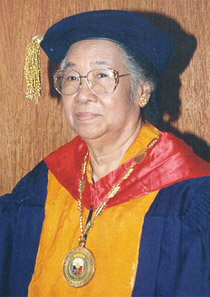
Clara Lim-Sylianco, National Scientist.
