= 1909 Birthday Honours =

National awards given by King Edward VII

The 1909 Birthday Honours for the British Empire were announced on 25 June, to celebrate the birthday of Edward VII.

The recipients of honours are displayed here as they were styled before their new honour, and arranged by honour, with classes (Knight, Knight Grand Cross, etc.) and then divisions (Military, Civil, etc.) as appropriate.

== The Most Honourable Order of the Bath ==
=== Knight Grand Cross of the Order of the Bath (GCB) ===
Military Division

- General Sir Bindon Blood, K.C.B.
- General Sir George Luck, K.C.B., Colonel, 15th (The King's) Hussars.
- General Sir Alfred Gaselee, G.C.I.E., K.C.B., Colonel, 54th Sikhs (Frontier Force).
- General Sir John Denton Pinkstone French, G.C.V.O., K.C.B., K.C.M.G., Colonel, 19th (Queen Alexandra's Own Royal) Hussars, Inspector-General of the Forces.
- Lieutenant-General Sir Edmund George Barrow, K.C.B., Colonel, 7th (Duke of Connaught's Own) Rajputs, Commanding Southern Army, East Indies.
- General Sir O'Moore Creagh, V.C., K.C.B., Colonel, 44th Merwara Infantry, Military Secretary, India Office.

Civil Division

- The Right Honourable Sir Ernest Cassel, G.C.M.G., G.C.V.O.
- Sir Edward Maunde Thompson, K.C.B., I.S.O.

=== Knight Commander of the Order of the Bath (KCB) ===
Military Division

- Vice-Admiral Sir Richard Poore, Bart., C.V.O.
- Vice-Admiral Sir Archibald Berkeley Milne, Bart., K.C.V.O.
- Vice-Admiral His Serene Highness Prince Louis Alexander of Battenberg, G.C.B. (Civil), G.C.V.O., K.C.M.G.
- Vice-Admiral George Neville, C.V.O.
- Vice-Admiral Alfred Leigh Winsloe, C.V.O., C.M.G.
- Major-General William Thompson Adair, Royal Marines.
- Lieutenant-General Sir Edward Pemberton Leach, V.C., K.C.V.O., C.B., General Officer Commanding-in-Chief, Scottish Command.
- Major-General Vincent William Tregear, C.B., late Bengal Infantry, Unemployed Supernumerary List.
- Surgeon-General Lionel Dixon Spencer, C.B., M.D., Indian Medical Service, retired, Honorary Surgeon to His Majesty the King.
- General Robert Melvill Jennings, C.B., Unemployed Supernumerary List, Colonel, 6th King Edward's Own Cavalry.
- Lieutenant-General George Lloyd Reilly Richardson, C.B., C.S.I., C.I.E., Indian Army, retired, Colonel, 18th Prince of Wales's Own Tiwana Lancers.
- Major-General Charles Henry Scott, C.B.
- Lieutenant-General Lewis Dening, C.B., D.S.O., Colonel, 26th Punjabis, Commanding Burma Division.
- Lieutenant-General Arthur George Frederic Browne, C.B., D.S.O., retired, Colonel, 4th Gurkha Rifles.

Civil Division

- Honorary Commander Charles Edward Hely Chadwyck Healey, C.B., K.C., R.N.R.
- Lieutenant-Colonel and Honorary Colonel George Coope Helme, C.B., C.M.G., late 6th Battalion, The Duke of Cambridge's Own (Middlesex Regiment) (Militia), Honorary Colonel, 6th Battalion, The Prince of Wales's Own (West Yorkshire Regiment).
- Lieutenant-Colonel and Honorary Colonel James Digby Legard, C.B., Honorary Colonel, The Yorkshire (Duke of York's Own) Royal Field Reserve Artillery.
- Colonel Nathaniel Creswick, C.B., late 4th West Riding of Yorkshire Royal Garrison Artillery (Volunteers).
- Honorary Colonel John Arthur Anstice, C.B., late 1st Volunteer Battalion, Shropshire Light Infantry, Honorary. Colonel, 4th Battalion The King's (Shropshire Light Infantry).
- Sir John Newell Jordan, K.C.M.G.
- John Arrow Kempe, Esq., C.B.
- Charles Edward Troup, Esq., C.B.
- Edward Stafford Howard, Esq., C.B.

=== Companion of the Order of the Bath (CB) ===
Military Division

- Surgeon-General Hayward Reader Whitehead, Principal Medical Officer, Southern Command.
- Colonel Richard Charles Bernard Lawrence.
- Brevet Colonel George Henry B. Coats, Indian Army.
- Colonel (temporary Brigadier-General) Richard Francis Johnson, C.M.G., Commanding South Irish Coast Defences, Irish Command.
- Brevet Colonel Arthur Mordaunt Murray, M.V.O., Commandant, Duke of York's Royal Military School.
- Brevet Colonel William Arthur D'Oyly O'Malley, Indian Army.
- Brevet Colonel William Tomes Fairbrother, Indian Army.
- Colonel Frederick Trenchard Thomas Fowle, Inspector-General of Ordnance, India.
- Colonel Frederick William Brooke Koe, Assistant Director of Supplies and Transport, South Africa.
- Colonel Raymond Burlton Williams, Assistant Adjutant and Quartermaster-General, Gibraltar.
- Colonel John Elford Dickie, Commanding Royal Engineers, 1st (Peshawar) Division, East Indies.
- Brevet Colonel George Eusebe Even, Indian Army.
- Colonel Thomas Arthur Harkness Davies, D.S.O., half-pay.
- Brevet Colonel Robert John Tudway, D.S.O., Commanding 2nd Battalion, The Essex Regiment.
- Colonel Francis John Pink,. C.M.G., D.S.O., half-pay.
- Colonel James Laird Irvine, Assistant Adjutant-General at Headquarters.
- Colonel Gervase Francis Newport Tinley, Indian Army.
- Colonel (temporary-Brigadier-General) David Henderson, D.S.O., Staff Officer to the Inspector-General of the Forces.
- Brevet Colonel Louis Augustus Gordon, Indian Army.
- Colonel Robert Pringle, D.S.O., Principal Veterinary Officer, Aldershot Command.
- Colonel Walter Adye, General Staff Officer, 1st Grade, at Headquarters.
- Lieutenant-Colonel Jenico Edward Preston, D.S.O., Indian Army.
- Lieutenant-Colonel Ponsonby Glenn Huggins, D.S.O., Indian Army.

Civil Division

- Lieutenant-Colonel and Honorary Colonel Dayrell Talbot Hammond, 4th Battalion, The Connaught Rangers.
- Lieutenant-Colonel and Honorary Colonel Henry Irvine, 3rd Battalion, The Royal Inniskilling Fusiliers.
- Lieutenant-Colonel and Honorary Colonel Sir James Hamlyn Williams-Drummond, Bart., The Carmarthen Royal1 Field Reserve Artillery.
- Lieutenant-Colonel and Honorary Colonel Claude Villiers Emilius Laurie, D.S.O., 3rd Battalion, The King's Own Scottish Borderers.
- Lieutenant-Colonel and Honorary Colonel Thomas Courtney Theydon Warner, 3rd Battalion, The Oxfordshire and Buckinghamshire Light Infantry.
- Colonel Thomas Sturmey Cave, Honorary Colonel, 4th Battalion, The Hampshire Regiment, Commanding South Midland Territorial Brigade, Southern Command.
- Colonel Sir Robert Cranston, K.C.V.O., lately Commanding the Lothian Brigade.
- Lieutenant-Colonel and Honorary Colonel Charles Coghlan, 1st West Riding Brigade, Royal Field Artillery.
- Lieutenant-Colonel and Honorary Colonel Charles Joseph Hart, Lieutenant-Colonel Commandant, 5th and 6th Battalions, The Royal Warwickshire Regiment.
- Lieutenant-Colonel and Honorary Colonel John Arthur Hughes, Welsh Divisional Engineers.
- Lieutenant-Colonel and Honorary Colonel Henry Denison, Nottinghamshire (Sherwood Rangers) Yeomanry.
- Lieutenant-Colonel and Honorary Colonel Edward Holmes Baldock, 3rd County of London Yeomanry (Sharpshooters).
- Colonel de Burgh Birch, M.D., Administrative Medical Officer, West Riding Division.
- Hay Frederick Donaldson, Esq., M.Inst.C.E., Chief Superintendent of the Royal Ordnance Factories.
- George Stapylton Barnes, Esq.
- Edmund Ernest Nott Bower, Esq.
- John Swanwick Bradbury, Esq.
- James Henry Brooks, Esq.
- Robert Bruce, Esq.
- William Robert Davies, Esq.
- Henry James Hapgood, Esq.
- Sir Robert Hunter.
- Vaughan Nash, Esq.
- William George Tyrrell, Esq.
- Major Edwin Frederick Wodehouse, R.A. (retired).
- Albert Charles Wratislaw, Esq., C.M.G.

== Order of the Star of India ==
=== Knight Grand Commander of the Order of the Star of India (GCSI) ===
- His Excellency General The Right Honourable Horatio Herbert Viscount Kitchener of Khartoum, G.C.B., O.M., G.C.M.G., G.C.I.E., Royal Engineers, Commander-in-Chief, India.

=== Knight Commander of the Order of the Star of India (KCSI) ===
- George Stuart Forbes, Esq., C.S.I., Indian Civil Service, an Ordinary Member of the Council of the Governor of Fort St. George.
- Captain His Highness Raja Sajjan Singh of Ratlam.

=== Companion of the Order of the Star of India (CSI) ===
- Krishna Gobinda Gupta, Esq., Indian Civil Service (retired), a Member of the Council of His Majesty's Secretary of State for India.
- Ashutosh Mukharji, Esq., M.A., D.L.. a Puisne Judge of the High Court of Judicature at Fort William in Bengal, and Vice-Chancellor of the University of Calcutta.
- Richard Amphlett Lamb, Esq., C.I.E., Indian Civil Service, Chief Secretary to the Government of Bombay, Revenue, Financial and Separate Departments, and an Additional Member of the Council of the Governor of Bombay for making Laws and Regulations.
- Major-General Henry Montague Pakington Hawkes, C.B., Indian Army, Director of Supplies and Transports.
- Dr. Rash Behary Ghose, C.I.E., D.L., lately an Additional Member of the Council of the Governor-General for making Laws and Regulations.
- Francis Capel Harrison, Esq., Indian Civil Service, Officiating Comptroller and Auditor-General.
- Hewling Luson, Esq., Indian Civil Service, Commissioner of a Division, Eastern Bengal and Assam.
- Major Percy Zachariah Cox, C.I.E., Political Resident in the Persian Gulf.

== Order of Saint Michael and Saint George ==
=== Knight Grand Cross of the Order of St Michael and St George (GCMG) ===
- Sir John Anderson, K.C.M.G., Governor and Commander-in-Chief of the Straits Settlements and their Dependencies.
- The Right Honourable Sir William Edward Goschen, G.C.V.O., K.C.M.G., His Majesty's Ambassador Extraordinary and Plenipotentiary at Berlin.
- The Right Honourable Sir Maurice William Ernest de Bunsen, G.C.V.O., K.C.M.G., C.B., His Majesty's Ambassador Extraordinary and Plenipotentiary at Madrid.
- Monsieur Louis Renault, Minister Plenipotentiary in the French Diplomatic Service, Professor at the "Faculte de Droit," Paris, Legal Adviser to the French Ministry for Foreign Affairs, Member of the Institute of France, Member of the Permanent Court of Arbitration at the Hague. (Honorary)

=== Knight Commander of the Order of St Michael and St George (KCMG) ===
- Major-General Harry Barron, C.V.O., Governor designate of the State of Tasmania.
- Hugh Charles Clifford, Esq., C.M.G., Colonial Secretary of the Island of Ceylon.
- Lieutenant-Colonel the Honourable John George Davies, C.M.G., Speaker of the House of Assembly of the State of Tasmania.
- Kenneth Skelton Anderson, Esq.
- James Beethom Whitehead, Esq., His Majesty's Envoy Extraordinary and Minister Plenipotentiary at Belgrade.
- Sir George William Buchanan, G.C.V.O., C.B., His Majesty's Envoy Extraordinary and Minister Plenipotentiary at the Hague and Luxemburg.
- Ralph Spencer Paget, Esq., C.V.O., C.M.G., His Majesty's Minister Resident at Munich and Stuttgart.
- Major Sir John Lane Harrington, K.C.V.O., C.B., late His Majesty's Envoy Extraordinary and Minister Plenipotentiary at Adis Abeba.

=== Companion of the Order of St Michael and St George (CMG) ===
- The Honourable George Throssell, Member of the Legislative Council of the State of Western Australia.
- Edmund Leslie Newcombe, Esq., K.C., LL.B.. Deputy Minister of Justice of the Dominion of Canada.
- Matthew Joseph Butler, Esq., Deputy Minister and Chief Engineer of Government Railways and Canals, Dominion of Canada.
- Professor William John Ritchie Simpson, M.D.; for services on various missions in connection with plague and the promotion of public health in the Colonies.
- Henry Conway Belfield, Esq., British Resident, Selangor.
- William Hart Bennett, Esq., Colonial Secretary of the Bahama Islands.
- Colonel William Throsby Bridges, Chief of the General Staff of the Military Forces of the Commonwealth of Australia.
- Alexander Bain Moncrieff, Esq., Engineer-in-Chief and Engineer of Harbours and Jetties, State of South Australia.
- Major George Edward Smith, R.E., Director of Surveys, East Africa Protectorate.
- Major George Charles Thomas Steward, Secretary to the Executive Council and Official Secretary to the Governor-General, Commonwealth of Australia.
- Patrick Joseph Garland, Esq., Deputy Principal Medical Officer, Gold Coast; in recognition of services in connection with the outbreak of plague at Accra.
- Oreste Grech Mifsud, Esq., LL.D., President of the Chamber of Advocates of the Island of Malta.
- Captain William Alexander Gordon, lately Private Secretary to the Governor of the Cape of Good Hope.
- John Francis Charles, Count de Salis, C.V.O., Councillor in His Majesty's Diplomatic Service.
- Frederick Samuel Augustus Bourne, Esq., Assistant Judge of His Majesty's Supreme Court for China and Corea.
- Walter Ralph Durie Beckett, Esq., His Majesty's Consul at Bangkok.
- Major Charles Hotham Montagu Doughty-Wylie, Acting British Vice-Consul at Konieh and Mersina; in recognition of his services during the recent disturbances in Asia Minor.
- Edgar Bonham Carter, Esq., Legal Secretary to the Soudan Government.

== Order of the Indian Empire ==
=== Knight Commander of the Order of the Indian Empire (KCIE) ===
- William Stevenson Meyer, Esq., C.I.E., Indian Civil Service, Secretary to the Government of India in the Finance Department.
- Wilhelm Schlich, Esq., C.I.E., Ph.D., late Indian Forest Department.

=== Companion of the Order of the Indian Empire (CIE) ===
- Henry Parsall Burt, Esq., A.M.I.C.E., Manager, North-Western Railway.
- Godfrey Butler Hunter Fell, Esq., Indian Civil Service, Deputy Secretary to the Government of India in the Home Department.
- John Newlands, Esq., Officer on Special Duty in connection with the re-organisation of the Telegraph Department.
- Colonel James Henry Elias Beer, V.D., Commandant, Mussoorie Volunteer Rifles.
- Lieutenant-Colonel Henry Parkin, Indian Army, Deputy Inspector-General of Military Police, Burma.
- Lieutenant-Colonel Robert Neil Campbell, M.B., Indian Medical Service, Officiating Inspector- General of Civil Hospitals, Eastern Bengal and Assam.
- Montagu Sherard Dawes Butler, Esq., Indian Civil Service, Deputy Commissioner of Lahore, and lately Settlement Officer, Kota, Rajputana.
- Major Stuart George Knox, lately Political Agent at Koweit.
- Captain Cecil Godfrey Bawling, Prince Albert's Somersetshire Light Infantry.
- Edgar Thurston, Esq., L.R.C.P., Superintendent, Government Central Museum, and Superintendent of Ethnography, Madras.
- Diwan Bahadur Seth Kastur Chand Daga, Rai Bahadur, of Bikaner, Rajputaria.
- Rai Natthi Mai Bahadur of Khurja in the Bulandshahr District, United Provinces.
- Rai Bahadur Buta Singh of Rawalpindi, Punjab.
- Henry Alexander Kirk, Esq., India Office, late India Telegraph Department, Director-in-Chief, Indo-European Telegraph Department.

== Royal Victorian Order ==
=== Knight Commander of the Royal Victorian Order (KCVO) ===
- Major-General The Honourable Sir Frederick William Stopford, K.C.M.G., C.B., General Officer Commanding London District.
- Almeric William Fitzroy, Esq., C.V.O., Clerk to the Privy Council.
- Major-General Douglas Haig, C.V.O.. C.B., Director of Staff Duties at Headquarters.
- The Very Reverend James Cameron Lees, C.V.O., D.D., Chaplain in Ordinary to His Majesty in Scotland and Dean of the Order of the Thistle.
- Lieutenant-Colonel FitzRoy Augustus Talbot Clayton, Chairman, Royal National Lifeboat Institution.

=== Commander of the Royal Victorian Order (CVO) ===
- Professor Laurits Regner Tuxen. (Honorary)
- Colonel The Lord William Cecil, M.V.O., Gentleman Usher to His Majesty, and Comptroller to Her Royal Highness Princess Beatrice (Princess Henry of Battenberg).
- Colonel The Honourable Cecil Edward Bingham, M.V.O., Commanding 1st Life Guards.
- The Honourable John Hubert Ward, M.V.O., Equerry to His Majesty.
- The Honourable Henry Julian Stonor, M.V.O., Groom in Waiting and Gentleman Usher to His Majesty.
- Sir Duncan Alexander Dundas Campbell, of Baraldine, Bart., Secretary to the Order of the Thistle.
- The Reverend Bertram Pollock, M.V.O., D.D., Master of Wellington College and Chaplain to His Majesty.
- Major Malcolm Donald Murray, M.V.O., Comptroller and Equerry to Field Marshal His Royal Highness The Duke of Connaught.
- Brigadier-General Charles Toler McMorrough Kavanagh, M.V.O., D.S.O., Commanding 1st Cavalry Brigade, Aldershot Command.
- The Reverend Hermann Adler, Ph.D., Chief Rabbi of the United Hebrew Congregations of the British Empire.

=== Member of the Royal Victorian Order, 4th class ===
- Sir George Compton Archibald Arthur, Bart.
- Admiral Henry Christian, Chief Constable of Gloucestershire.
- Major James Evan Baillie Martin, Comptroller and Treasurer to Their Royal Highnesses Prince and Princess Christian of Schleswig Holstein.

== Imperial Service Order ==
- Charles Wilgress Anderson, Esq.., First Class Officer, Department of Lands and Mines of the Colony, of British Guiana.
- Edward Jordon Andrews, Esq., Public Treasurer of the Island of Jamaica.
- William Douglas Auchinleck, Esq., Auditor-General of the Leeward Islands,
- John Charles Aylan, Esq., late Manager of the East Laboratory, Royal Arsenal.
- Seymour John Bennett, Esq., Inspector af Stamping, Inland Revenue.
- Thomas Briggs, Esq., Vice-Controller, London Postal Service.
- Joseph Brown, Esq., Superintendent of Police of the Colony of the Gambia.
- George Cole, Esq., Inspector and General Superintendent of Schools, Bahama Islands.
- Colonel Robert Joseph Collins, Secretary to the Treasury, Receiver-General and Paymaster-General, Dominion of New Zealand.
- Thomas Garvin, Esq., Inspector-General of Police of the State of New South Wales.
- William John Gerald, Esq., Deputy Minister of Inland Revenue of the Dominion of Canada.
- Arthur Hill, Esq., First Class Assistant Clerk, Board of Trade.
- Robert Hobbins, Esq., Collector of Customs and Excise, Belfast.
- Lionel Charles Hopkins, Esq, late Consul-General, Tientsin.
- John Robert Jarman, Esq., Sub-Inspector, Board of Education.
- William Charles Kensington, Esq., Under Secretary for Crown Lands, Dominion of New Zealand.
- Seymour Henry Knyvett, Esq., Deputy Chief Inspector of Factories, Home Office.
- James Kennedy Logan, Esq., Superintendent of Electric Lines, Post Office and Telegraph Department, Dominion of New Zealand.
- Charles Long, Esq., lately Postmaster, Pretoria, The Transvaal.
- Edward John March, Esq., Government Printer of the Colony of Fiji.
- Joseph O'Reilly, Esq., Inspector, Revenue Preventive Service, Island of Newfoundland.
- George Ross, Esq., Chief Post Office Superintendent for the Post Office Department, Dominion of Canada.
- William James Scott, Esq., Under Secretary, Department of Public Lands, State of Queensland.
- Francis Ellis Tucker, Esq., late Assistant Secretary, British Museum.
- Alfred Charles Waters, Esq., Chief Clerk, General Register Office.
