= Oskar Frankfurter =

German anthropologist (1851–1922)

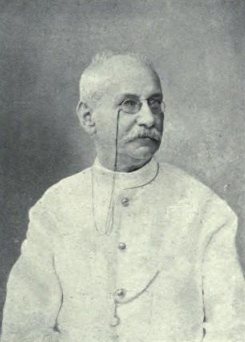
- From a 1908 publication
- Born: 23 February 1851; Hamburg, Germany
- Died: 1 October 1922 (aged 71); Hamburg, Germany

Academic background
- Education: University of Göttingen, Humboldt University of Berlin

Academic work
- Discipline: Anthropologist
- Sub-discipline: Pali, Sanskrit and Siamese languages
- Institutions: National Library of Thailand (1905-1917)

Oskar Frankfurter (23 February 1851 – 1 October 1922) was a German anthropologist, scholar of Pali and Sanskrit, and a leading authority on the languages, history and culture of Siam. He was the first director of the State Library of Siam.

== Early life and education ==
Frankfurter was born on 23 February 1851 in Hamburg, Germany, the son of Naphtali Frankfurter and his wife Amalie. He was educated at Johanneum Gymnasium, Hamburg, University of Göttingen and Humboldt University of Berlin where he took a Ph.D.

Frankfurter then went to Oxford University to pursue further study of Pali, Sanskrit and Siamese, and in 1883 published a book on Pali grammar. In Oxford he met Prince Prisdang of Siam in Oxford, and in February 1884 went to Bangkok having been offered an appointment with the Siamese government.

== Career ==
Frankfurter joined the Siamese government as an interpreter at the Ministry of Foreign Affairs. He was initially employed as secretary and interpreter to Prince Devawongse in Bangkok and continued as his assistant after the prince was appointed Minister of Foreign Affairs. Later, he was transferred to the Ministry of the Interior. In 1905, when King Rama V established the State Library Frankfurter was appointed its first director. He transformed the old institution "from a sort of club, resorted to by a few young men for the purpose of playing billiards", into an extensive library and a centre for Thai studies. In 1904, he co-founded the Siam Society and served as its president from 1906 to 1917.

When Siam declared war on Germany in 1917, Frankfurter's employment, as a German citizen, was terminated and he lost his pension. He was interned in Bangkok until the winter of 1918 when he was handed over to the British. Until December 1919, he was held by the British near Hyderabad, India before he returned to Germany in 1920. From 1921 to 1922, he lived in Hamburg and taught Siamese at Hamburg University.

== Personal life and death ==
Frankfurter married Amely Tony Lefeld.

He died in Hamburg on 1 October 1922, aged 71.

== Honours ==
- Frankfurter was appointed Officer of the Order of the White Elephant, 4th class, in 1893.
- He was appointed Officer of the Order of the Red Eagle, 4th class, in 1914.

== Publications ==
– Buddhist Nirvāṇa and the Noble Eightfold Path, 1880, (pp. 548–574).

– Buddhist Chronology, 1880.

– List of Pāli Manuscripts in the Bodleian Library, Oxford, Journal of the Pali Text Society 1882 (8 manuscripts only).

– Handbook of Pali being an elementary grammar, a chrestomathy, and a glossary, Williams and Norgate 1883. (Forgotten Books, ISBN 978-0484826259, 2018).

– Sanskrit khaḍga u.s.w., 1885.

– The Kingdom of Siam, 1904, edited by A. Cecil Carter, reprinted by the Siam Society (3 chapters only).

Numerous articles on the language, history and culture of Siam in the Journal of the Siam Society including:–

– King Mongkut, JSS 1904

– The attitudes of the Buddha, JSS 1913

– Translation of Luang Prasert’s Chronicle of Ayudhya, JSS
