= General Whitehead =

General Whitehead may refer to:

- Ennis Whitehead (1895–1964), U.S. Army Air Forces lieutenant general
- Hayward Reader Whitehead (1855–1925), British Army major general
