= Siam in World War I =

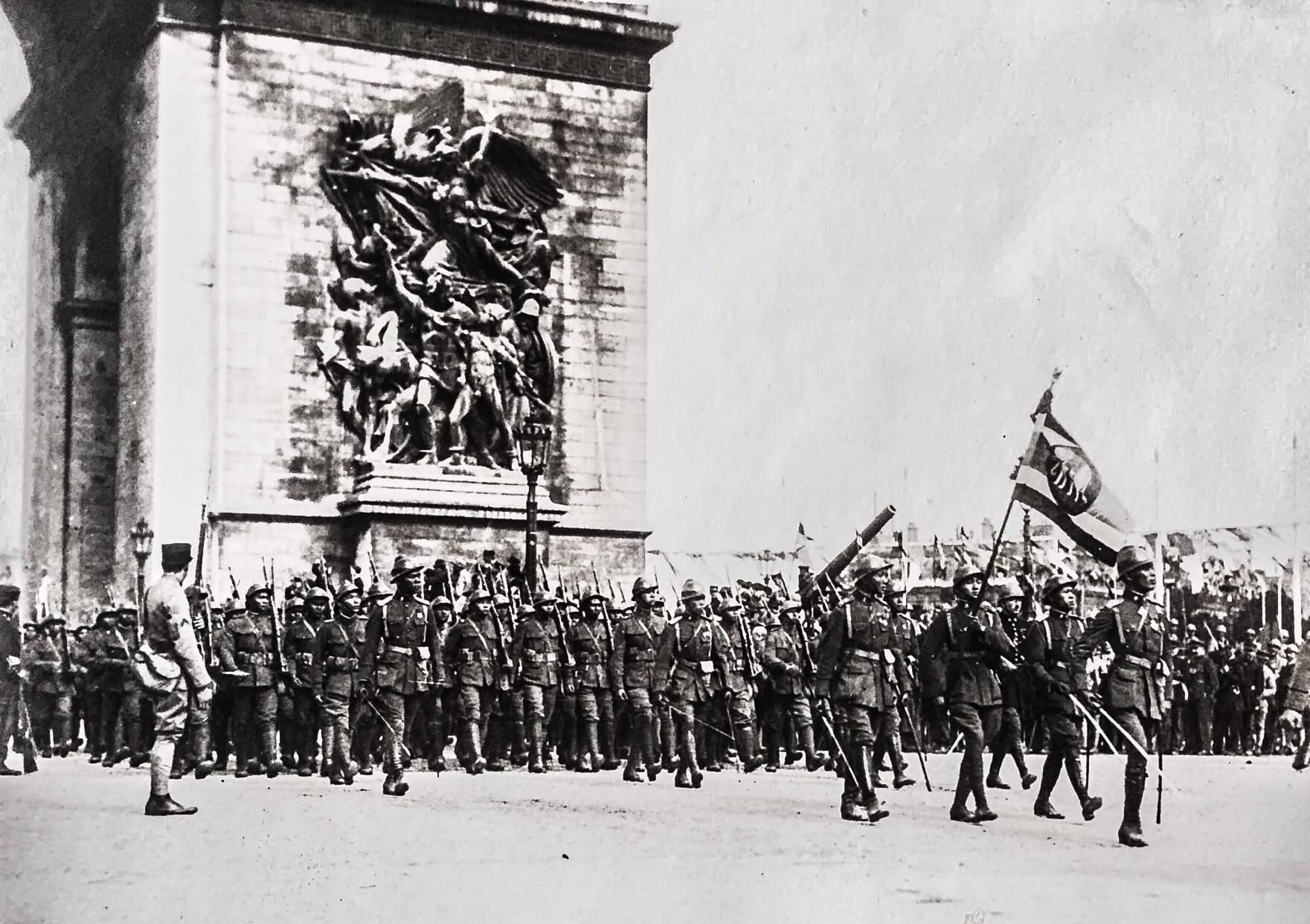
The Siamese Expeditionary Force, 1919 Paris Victory Parade.

The Kingdom of Siam, now known as Thailand, was a participant in World War I on the Allied side. Siam contributed to the fight against the Central Powers in one of the critical campaigns of the war. It sent an Expeditionary Force to France to serve on the Western Front.

At the start of the war in 1914, Siam declared their neutrality. The kingdom maintained this status until July 1917 when it declared war on Germany and Austria-Hungary. Following both military and specialist training, a Siamese military contingent arrived on the Western Front in mid-September 1918, only two months before the war ended. Following the Armistice of 11 November 1918, Siamese troops contributed to the initial occupation of Rhineland, when they took over the town of Neustadt an der Haardt.

== Background ==
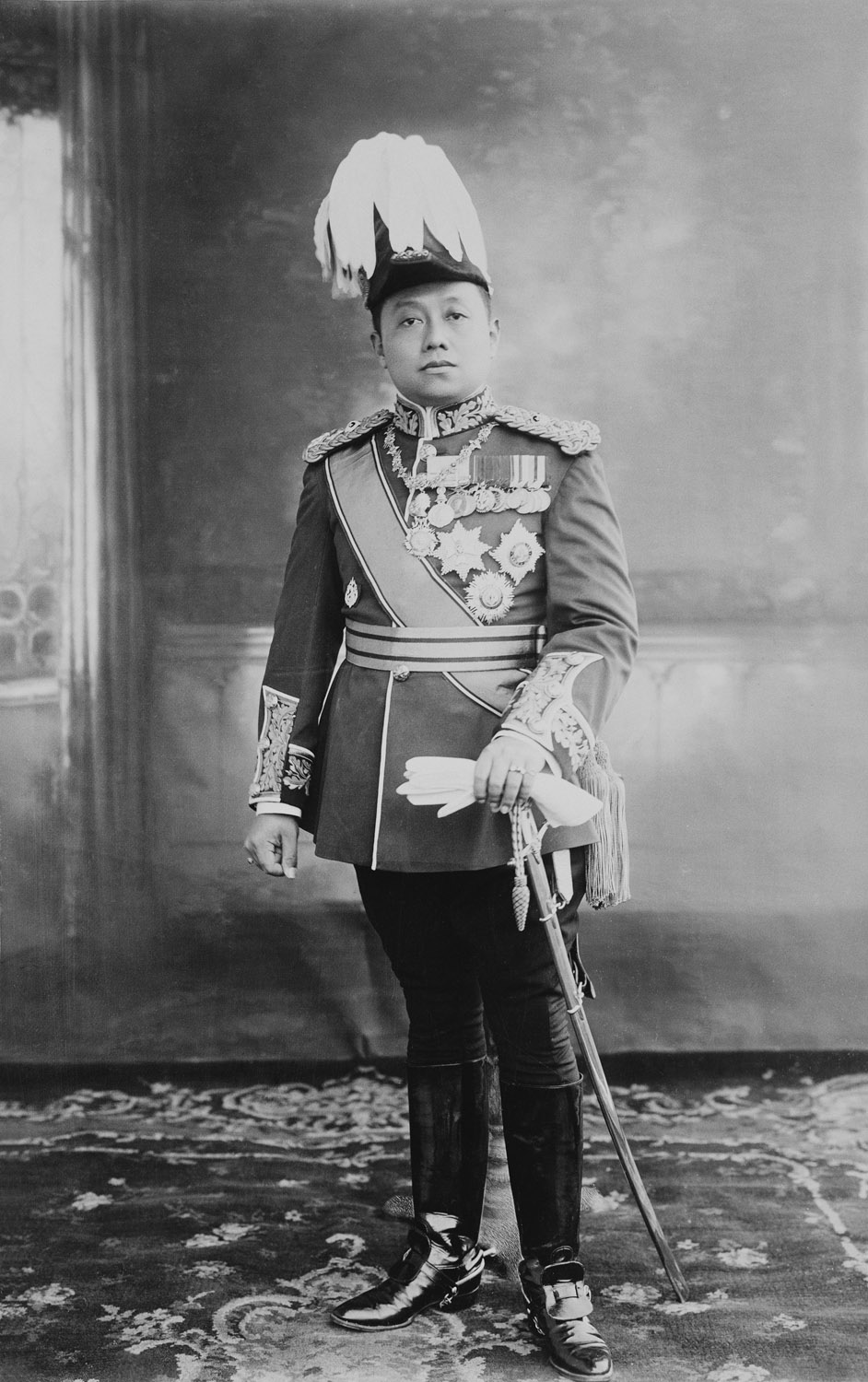
King Vajiravudh (or Rama VI) dressed in a uniform of a British General in 1917.

At the dawn of the First World War, Siam had cordial relations with both sides. Siam was the only Asian country where German businesses were well entrenched, with an annual volume of 22 million German marks in trade before the war. The Siamese government had 48 German nationals working for it. Germans such as Oskar Frankfurter, who set up the Siamese national library, and Emil Florio, responsible for heading the Siam Commercial Bank, were important to the country. On the other hand, Prince Devawongse Varoprakar (the Siamese foreign minister) was friendly with British figures such as British Minister Sir Herbert Dering, who advised him on policy. The king himself, Rama VI, was British-educated, and other princes heavily involved in policy making, such as Prince Charoon and Prince Chakrabongse Bhuvanath, were aligned with the Entente. Siam's rice trade was dominated by Britain, and the Commissioner of Police in Siam was a Briton.

The princes of Siam, who acted as ministers and decision-makers, were split on the matter, although they did prefer Britain. Prince Chakrabongse, next in line to the throne from Rama VI (Vajiravudh) and chief of the general staff, had a hatred for anything British, but had a love for Russia and France due to his stay in Russia. He was an aggressive, hawkish prince, advocating for war. He ended up organizing the Siamese Expeditionary Force in the future. Prince Devawongse, however, who was in charge of foreign affairs, was much more moderate in his approach. He was on the other side of the spectrum for Chakrabongse, preferring to keep Siam neutral but not wishing to harm relations with Britain and France. Prince Charoon, Siam's most important diplomat, was a pro-British Anglophile with doubts towards France. However, other senior princes such as Prince Paribatra Sukhumbandhu, Mahidol Adulyadej, and Rangsit Prayurasakdi were pro-German. They had been educated in Germany and had good friendships with Germans. Prince Paribatra was the Minister of the Navy from 1910 to 1920.

Other major players in Siamese foreign policy included British Minister Herbert Dering, one of the most powerful foreigners in Siam, the unpopular Pierre Lefèvre-Pontalis representing France, Ferdinand Jacobus Domela Nieuwenhuis representing the Netherlands (pushing pro-German views, disliked by many) and Paul von Buri, German minister in Bangkok. The Austro-Hungarians did not have much of a stake in Siam. Both the German and Austro-Hungarian ministers, von Buri and Count Wodianer von Maglód, left for home in 1914 and could not return, leaving their German and Austro-Hungarian embassies in the charges of Erwin Remy and Emil Keil, respectively.

Although it had been successful in maintaining its independence from the European colonial powers, Siam had been compelled to cede Laos and Cambodia to France and Kedah, Kelantan, Trengganu, and Perlis to Britain between 1889 and 1909, and the Siamese government was induced to grant extraterritorial rights to foreign citizens. By 1909, a long period of negotiations about Siamese borders had effectively ended. Rama VI hoped to revise unequal treaties by taking the side of the Allied Powers.

World War I had no direct impact on Siam because of the great distance not only from Europe but also from Germany's colonial territories in the Pacific and on the China coast. So, in July 1914, the Siamese officially announced their neutrality in the war. Arguments given for why this happened include the Siamese desire for a stable economy, fear of a possible foreign invasion from nearby colonial territories such as India and Malaya, and national pride, as many Siamese citizens were against the idea of fighting alongside nations to which they had ceded land. Joining the war, however, would allow the king to strengthen Siam's position in the international arena and strengthen the monarchy in the Siamese state.

Siam was, in some ways, affected by the war. Siamese princes in Europe were affected by the beginning of the war. Prince Mahidol, studying in Germany, was advised to leave to a neutral country and study a useful subject such as "languages, International Laws, etc.", but he refused and stayed until 1915. Prince Chudadhuj Dharadilok was travelling in Switzerland. Phra Sanphakit Pricha at the London legation was ordered to bring the prince to France. Young princes enrolled in secondary or tertiary education in Germany remained, and Siamese princes in foreign armies such as Prajadhipok (later Rama VII) were told to leave their positions to comply with Siamese neutrality. Prince Purachatra Jayakara went for a cruise in the Norwegian fjords in July 1914 as the war broke out. On the economic side, Siam was hit heavily. Shipping at Bangkok ceased in August 1914, and German ships trading from Singapore to Hong Kong sought refuge on Siamese shores. Prices for imports shot up by 30-40% on average, and railway construction slowed to a crawl as steel and cement could not be obtained. However, prices returned to normal by September as British and Norwegian ships took over trade. German businesses in Siam failed, and by 1915, the Deutsch-Siamesische Handelsgesellschaft was liquidated.

During the Siamese period of neutrality, the Germans had plans for launching operations within Siam. The German-supported Indian nationalist Ghadar Party sought to establish a route between North America and India through Siam. The Germans wished to set up a camp in the jungles near the Burmese border. The German council in the Shanghai International Settlement would send weapons to the camp to train Ghadar revolutionaries who would be sent into Burma to turn the local military police—mostly Indians—against the colonial authorities. This was noted by the British in Bangkok, and British Minister in Siam Herbert Dering informed Prince Devawongse about it, claiming that the Germans planned to raise a 10,000 man army to overthrow British rule in India. It was revealed later that parts of the plan were accomplished: Germans living in Chicago sent arms and money to the rebels, and the German consul in Bangkok, Erwin Remy, and the German ambassador in Shanghai, Hubert Knipping (de), were responsible for setting up and funding the camp.

On the British side, English-language newspapers in Siam were pro-Entente. The Germans, in response, set up their own newspaper, the Umschau. The Siamese worked with the British to reveal the German-Indian conspiracy, and tightened their control on the Southern railway and the west coast to watch for Indian nationalist revolutionaries and supplies sent by Japanese citizens sympathetic to the Central Powers. The British commended Siam for "the services they have rendered". Beginning in 1915, the King himself exhibited his pro-Entente views. In late-1915, he donated money to the widows and orphans of men in the Durham Light Infantry, in which he had served. In September, the King was offered an honorary generalship from King George V, and Rama VI offered a Siamese generalship in return. Princes were notably present at events for Allied Red Cross groups. The sinking of the Lusitania moved the King to write a lengthy article in the Royal Navy League journal, Samutthasan, denouncing the act. Although he held anti-German views, he wrote under a pseudonym and was cautious about expressing his opinion in public.

The King used the war as a means to promote the concept of a Siamese nation and to confirm his supremacy as its head, a status that had been challenged by elements of the military in the Palace Revolt of 1912.

== War ==
Siam was the sole country in Southeast Asia to maintain independence throughout the colonial era, and the only state in the region to enter the conflict entirely of its own free will, as an equal of the European powers rather than as part of their colonial contingents; as well as being one of the only two Southeast Asian peoples/nations (the other being the Vietnamese) to have fought in the conflict.

On 22nd September 1917, Siam declared war on the German and Austro-Hungarian empires. Immediately, 320 German and Austro-Hungarian nationals were put under guard, with 193 non-diplomatic males being peacefully interned in a prisoner-of-war camp in Bangkok. 124 German women and children, including the Thai wives and children of German men, were interned at the German Club. However, the presence of two internment camps in Bangkok raised fears in the government, whilst Britain began pressuring Siam to transport their POWs to India. Eventually, the interned Germans and Austro-Hungarians were deported to British India in February 1918, where they would be interned in camps in Ahmednagar and Belgaum until 1920. Apart from the immediate seizure of enemy nationals, nine German ships on the Chao Phraya River were then seized by Siamese authorities. These ships would remain in Siamese control for several months before the largest seven were handed over to the Allies, with Siam keeping the smallest two. German businesses, assets and property were also seized.

During WWI, King Rama VI ordered changes made to the Siamese national flag in 1916–1917, from the white elephant on a red background to a five-stripe design of red and white for civil purposes, and eventually to the red, white, and blue national ensign used today, taking inspiration from Allied flags.

As a clear symbol of the new two-track strategy of active association with the world powers and of renewal and restructuring within the nation, the King authorised a re-design of the national flag. The new flag had an extra colour, blue, and was arranged in stripes. It was said to represent the three elements of the nation: creed, crown, and community. Representation of the military was subsumed between the King and the people. The new colours of blue, white, and red, also sat comfortably, almost certainly deliberately, with the flags of Great Britain, France, the United States, and Russia. The new flag appeared on the 28 September 1917. Initially, two variants were common: the current minimalist five horizontal bands and a variant maintaining the continuity and prestige of the old flag, with the traditional white elephant symbol on a red disc, from the old flag, superimposed over the new stripes, a variant the remains today the flag of the Royal Thai Navy. When the Siamese Expeditionary Force marched in the 1919 Paris victory parade, it was beneath the hybrid flag.

In September 1917, a volunteer expeditionary force was assembled, consisting of medical, motor transport, and aviation detachments. By early-1918, 1,284 men were selected from thousands of volunteers. The force, commanded by Major-General Phraya Pichai Charnyarit, was to be sent to France. On 30 July 1918, the Siamese landed in Marseille. Some 370 pilots and groundcrew were sent to aerodromes in Istres, Le Crotoy, La Chapelle-la-Reine, Biscarosse and Piox for retraining, as the pilots were deemed incapable of withstanding high altitude air combat.

Also in August 1918, the medical and motor transport detachments were sent to the front and took part in the 1918 Champagne and Meuse-Argonne offensives. Siamese airmen had not finished training when the time the Armistice of 11 November 1918 was signed. The ground forces, on the other hand, had distinguished themselves under fire and were awarded the Croix de Guerre and Order of Rama decorations. The ground forces participated in the occupation of Neustadt an der Haardt in the Rhineland region of Germany and also took part in the 1919 Paris Victory Parade.

== Equipment ==
Sidearms

- Mauser C96
- FN M1900
- FN Model 1910
- Luger pistol
- 1902 Nambu
- Nambu automatic pistol Type A
- Type 26 revolver

Rifles

- Mauser Model 1871
- Mannlicher M1888
- Mannlicher M1890 carbine
- Siamese Mauser style rifle (standard issue rifle)

Machine gun

- Gatling gun (Pre World War 1)

Field guns

- Krupp 50mm mountain gun
- Krupp 7.5 cm Model 1903

Naval artillery

- BL 6-inch gun Mk V (coast defence gun)

Destroyers

- HTMS Pra Ruang (เรือหลวงพระร่วง)
- HTMS Sua Thayanchon (เรือหลวงเสือทยานชล)
- HTMS Sua Khamronsin (เรือหลวงเสือคำรณสินธุ์)

Armored cars

- Siamese armored car (missing)
- Searchlight vehicle (missing)

Aircraft

- Nieuport II
- Nieuport IV
- Breguet Type III
- Nieuport 11
- Nieuport 16
- Nieuport 17
- Nieuport 24
- Nieuport 27

== Aftermath ==
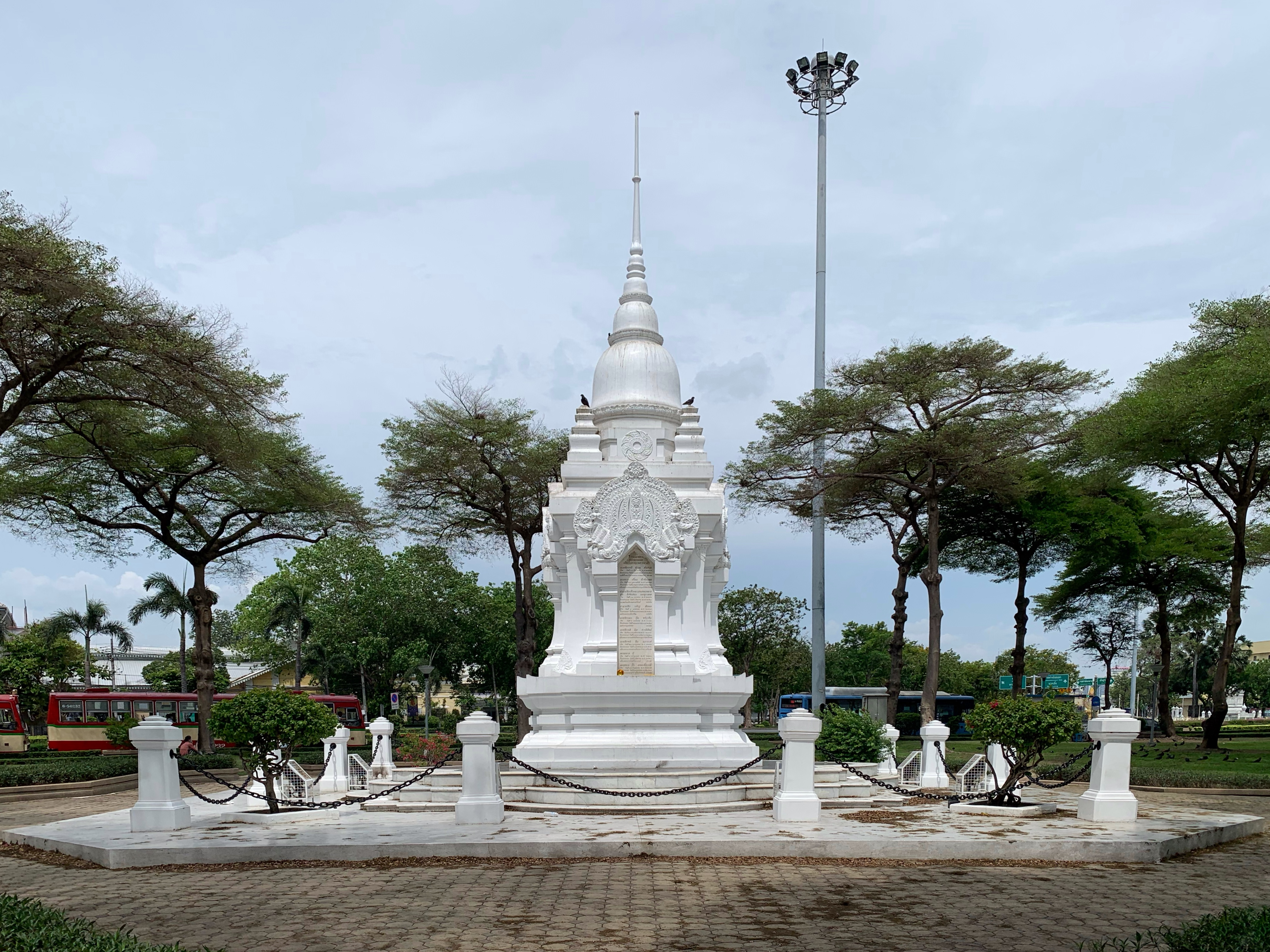
Thai World War Volunteers Memorial, Bangkok. [th]

At war's end, Siam participated in the Paris Peace Conference and became a founding member of the League of Nations. By 1925, the United States, the United Kingdom, and France had abandoned their extraterritorial rights in Siam. Siam was rewarded with confiscated German merchant ships.

Siamese casualties during the war amounted to 19 dead. Two soldiers died before departure to France, and the remainder perished from accidents or disease. The World War Volunteers Memorial honoring the Siamese soldiers who died in the conflict opened on 22 July 1921, in Sanam Luang, central Bangkok. The last surviving member of the Siamese Expeditionary Forces, Yod Sangrungruang, died on 9 October 2003 at the age of 106.

== See also ==
- Siamese Expeditionary Forces
- Siamese Occupation of Germany https://mgronline.com/onlinesection/detail/9620000107212
