= Walter Beckett =

Walter Beckett may refer to:

- Walter Beckett (composer) (1914–1996), Irish composer
- Walter Ralph Durie Beckett (1864–1917), British diplomat
- W. N. T. Beckett (1893–1941), English Navy officer
