= Barend Jan Terwiel =

Australian historian and anthropologist

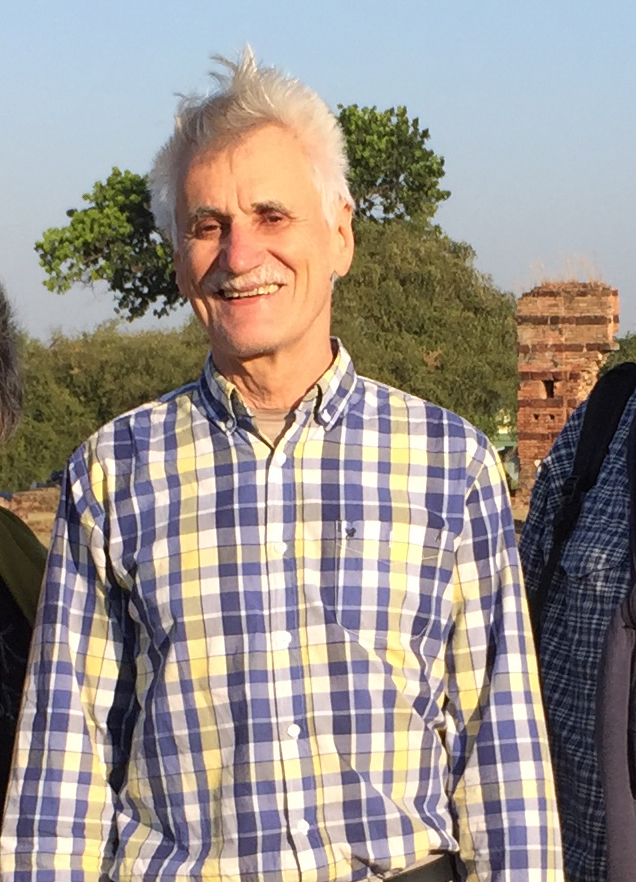
- Born: Barend Jan Terwiel; November 24, 1941; Ginneken, Netherlands
- Scientific career
- Fields: History of Thailand and Thai culture

Barend Jan (Baas) Terwiel (born 24 November 1941) is a Dutch-Australian anthropologist, historian and Thai studies scholar. He has written books on ethnology of Tai peoples and Ahom, the history and culture of Thailand as well as historical travel of Europeans to mainland Southeast Asia. He retired in 2007, although he still writes about Thailand, releasing a new edition of his book Thailand's Political History in 2010. He authored 11 articles over 47 years from 1972 to 2019 for Journal of the Siam Society.

== Education ==
Terwiel was born in Ginneken near Breda in the Netherlands. After his military service in Netherlands New Guinea, Terwiel had to spend a few days in Bangkok due to a lack of transport capacity, which aroused his interest for Thailand. He completed his studies at the Utrecht University with a candidaats degree in Cultural Anthropology in 1965 and a doctorandus degree in anthropology, Pali and the History of Buddhism in 1967. For his doctoral studies, he moved to the Australian National University where he graduated with a Ph.D. in 1972. For his dissertation project, he had himself ordained as a Buddhist monk and lived for a year in a village monastery in central Thailand to explore ceremonies and religious practice of Thai Buddhism from an inner perspective.

== Career ==
From 1972 to 1974, Terwiel worked as a coordinator training volunteers at the Dutch Royal Tropical Institute, Amsterdam. Then, he became a lecturer at the Faculty of Asian Studies of the Australian National University in Canberra, where he was promoted to Senior Lecturer in 1982 and Reader in Asian History in 1991. In the same year, he was appointed Professor at the Institute of Ethnology of LMU Munich, Germany. In 1992, Terwiel moved to the Asia and Africa Institute of the University of Hamburg where he held the Chair of Languages and Cultures of Thailand and Laos until his retirement in 2007.

== Publications ==
Terwiel, B. J.(1979). Seven probes in rural South East Asia : socio-economic and anthropological. South East Asian Review Office for the Centre for South East Asian Studies.

Terwiel, B. J. (1980). Field Marshal Plaek Phibun Songkhram. University of Queensland Press.

Terwiel, B. J. (1983). A history of modern Thailand, 1767-1942. University of Queensland Press.

Terwiel, B. J. (1989). A window on Thai history. Editions Duang Kamol.

Terwiel, B. J. (1989). Through travellers’ eyes : an approach to early nineteenth-century Thai history. Editions Duang Kamol.

Terwiel, B. J., Diller, A., & Chonthirā Sattayāwatthanā. (1990). Thon Tai (dōēm) mai dai yū thīnī. Mū‘angbōrān.

Terwiel, B. J., & Ranoo Wichasin. (1992). Tai Ahoms and the stars : three ritual texts to ward off danger = Tamrā dūangdāo Thai ʻĀhom : ʻēkkasān sado̜ khro̜ 3 samnūan. Southeast Asia Program, Cornell University.

Terwiel, B. J. (1994). Monks and magic : an analysis of religious ceremonies in central Thailand (3rd rev. ed). White Lotus.

Terwiel, B. J., & Chāichư̄n Khamdǣngyō̜ttai. (2003). Shan manuscripts. F. Steiner.

Terwiel, B. J. (2008). A traveler in Siam in the year 1655 : extracts from the journal of Gijsbert Heeck. Silkworm Books.

Terwiel, B. J. (2010). The Ram Khamhaeng inscription : the fake that did not come true (1. Aufl). Ostasien Verlag.

Terwiel, B. J. (2011). Monks and magic revisiting a classic study of religious ceremonies in Thailand (New ed). NIAS.

Terwiel, B. J. (2011). Thailand’s political history : from the 13th century to recent times. River Books.

Terwiel, B. J. (2012). “Siam” : ten ways to look at Thailand’s past. Ostasien Verlag.

Terwiel, B. J., & Wichasin, R. (2018). Tai Ahoms and the Stars : Three Ritual Texts to Ward off Danger. Cornell University, Southeast Asia Program Publications. https://www.degruyter.com/doi/book/10.7591/9781501719004
