= G. S. Forbes =

Sir George Stuart Forbes KCSI (27 October 1849 – 17 April 1941) was an Indian civil servant who served as a member of the Executive Council of the Governor of Madras from 1906 to 1909.

== Early life ==
Forbes was born in Forgue on 27 October 1849. He had his schooling at Aberdeen Grammar School and graduated from Aberdeen University. He qualified for the Indian Civil Service in 1871 and went to the India, the following year. He was also interested in astronomy, being a member of the British Astronomical Association from its foundation until his death and a fellow of the Royal Astronomical Society, which has an obituary of him in its "Monthly Notices" volume 101 p. 132, and an entry is in "Who was Who". All sources gives year of death as 1940.

== Career ==
Forbes served in the Indian Civil Service from 1872 to 1909 and was Secretary to the British Resident at Hyderabad, Secretary for Berar and Chief Secretary to the Governor of Madras at different times. In 1906, he was nominated to the Madras Legislative Council and served until his retirement in 1909.

== Later life and death ==
Forbes died at Sevenoaks, United Kingdom on 17 April 1940 at the age of 90.

== Honours ==
Forbes was made a Companion of the Order of the Star of India in 1904 and promoted to Knight Commander of the Order of the Star of India in the 1909 Birthday Honours.
