= Kamthieng House Museum =

Museum in Bangkok, Thailand

- พิพิธภัณฑ์เรือนคำเที่ยง
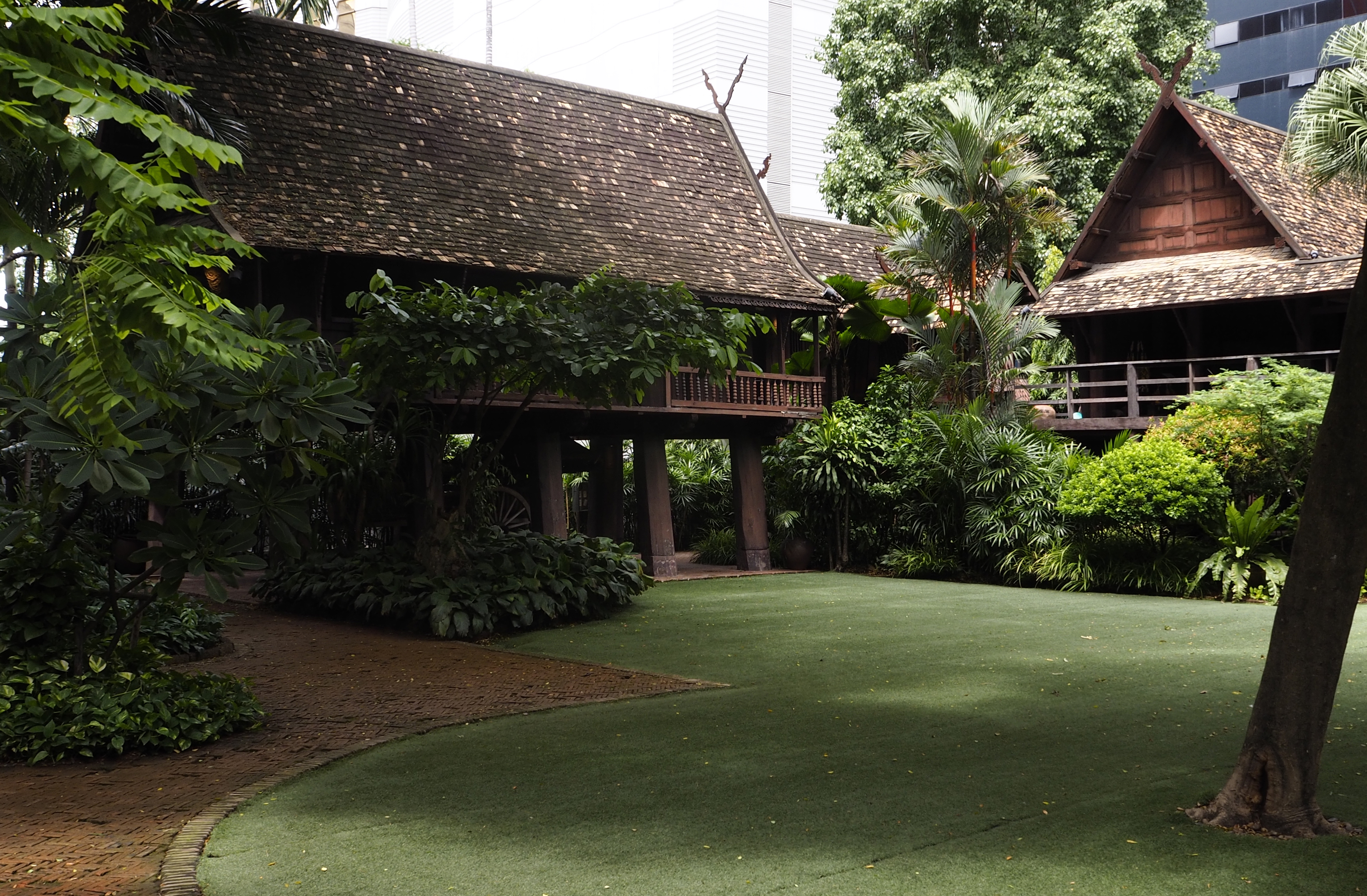
- In 2019
- Established: November 21, 1966
- Location: 131 Asok Montri Rd, Khlong Toei, Watthana District, Bangkok, Thailand
- Coordinates: 13.7393°N 100.5612°E
- Owner: Siam Society
- Website: https://thesiamsociety.org/facilities/kamthieng-house-museum-saeng-aroon-house/

The Kamthieng House Museum (Thai: พิพิธภัณฑ์เรือนคำเที่ยง) is a museum in Watthana District, Bangkok, run by the Siam Society under royal patronage. It is a 174-year-old traditional teakwood house from Chiang Mai that was transported to Bangkok and opened by King Bhumibol in 1966.

The house is an example of traditional housing from Northern Thailand and showcases the culture and lifestyle of the northern Lanna people. Due to its exposure to the elements for around 2 centuries, the house is in a fragile state, with the roof being in need for renovation.

== Design ==
The house consists of 2 rectangular houses with covered verandas and a walkway leading to the kitchen, all of which is elevated from the ground on 36 octagonal teak pillars. Following the style found in Northern houses, its walls slightly lean outward to the lower edge of the roof which is in a V-shape. Although not part of the original, an open veranda and two rice granaries were added from Chiang Mai.

== History ==
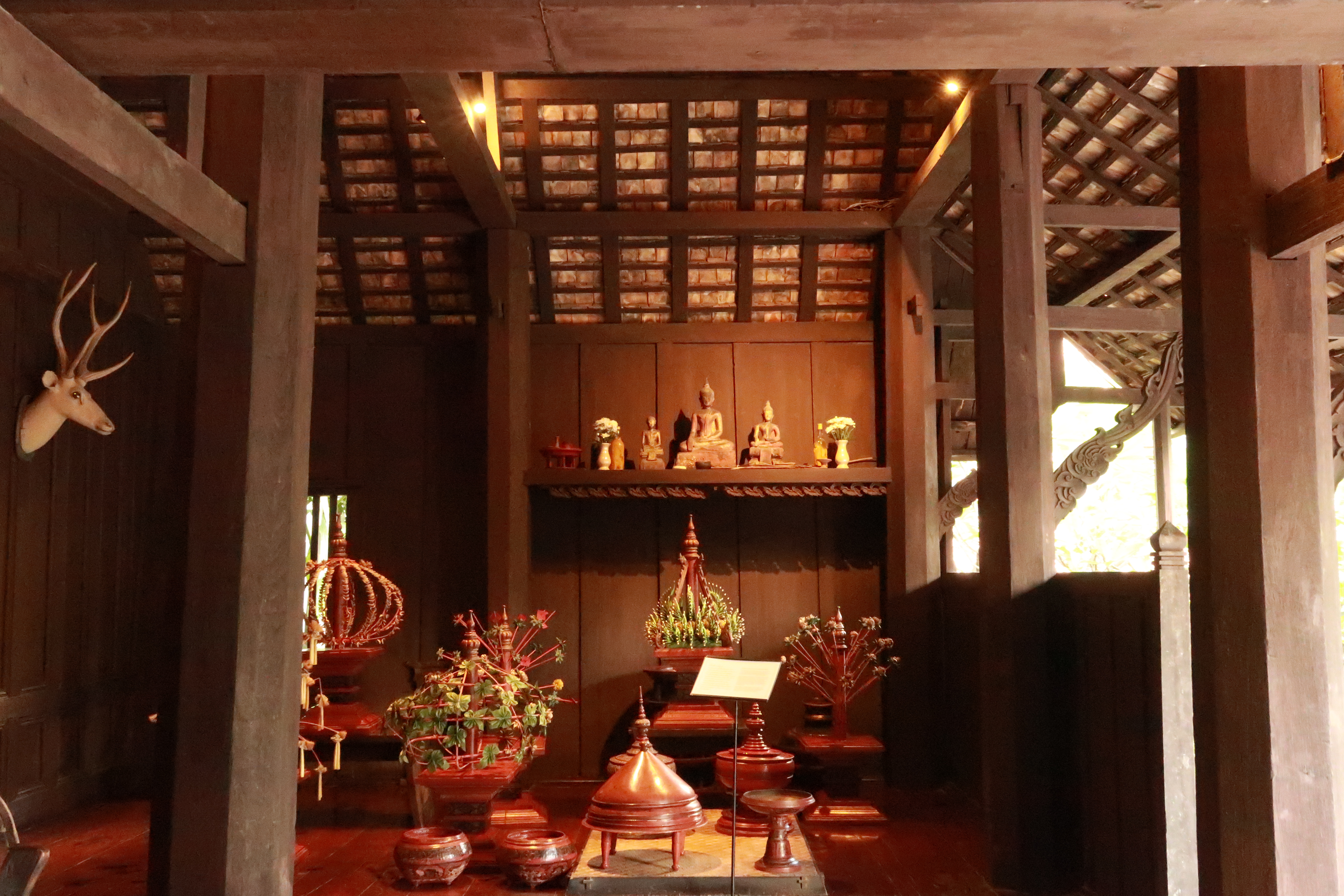
Interior of the House

The teakwood house was built in the mid-1800s in Chiang Mai, Kingdom of Chiang Mai. Originally situated on the east bank of the Ping River, it was built by the great-granddaughter of a Mueang Chae prince, Mae Saed. After being passed down through several generations of a Lanna matrilineal clan, it was gifted in 1963 to the Siam Society by Kimhaw Nimmanhaeminda. Kimhaw was a direct descendant of Mae Saed, and the house was named after her mother, Kamthieng Anusarnsunthorn. Kamthieng was born within this house.

In order to be transported to Bangkok, the house was dismantled, transported from Chiang Mai and reconstructed in Bangkok within the span of two years. On 21 November 1966, the museum was opened by then current king of Thailand, Bhumibol Adulyadej. The exhibition was initially installed to provide knowledge about the beliefs and culture of the Lanna people.
