= Siam Society =

The Siam Society and Kamthieng House Museum
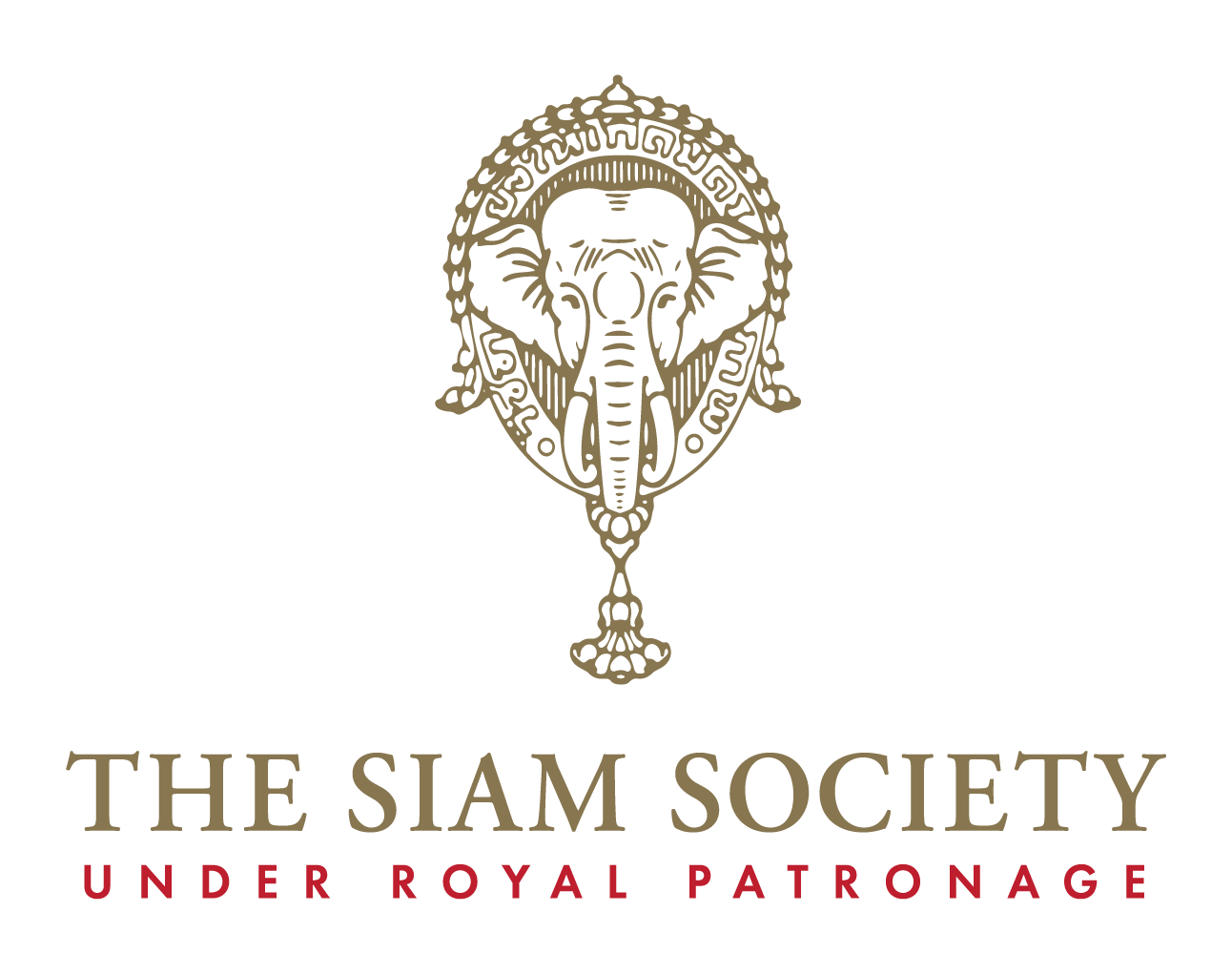
- Established: 1904; 122 years ago
- Location: 131 Sukhumwit Soi 21 (Asoke-Montri Road), Bangkok 10110, Thailand
- Coordinates: 13.7395°N 100.5612°E
- President: Mrs Bilaibhan Sampatisiri
- Public transit access: Bangkok BTS, Sukhumvit Line, Asoke Station, Exit 3; Bangkok MRT, Blue Line, Sukhumvit Station, Exit 1
- Website: Official website

The Siam Society Under Royal Patronage (Thai: สยามสมาคมในพระบรมราชูปถัมภ์; RTGS: Sayam Samakhon nai Phra Borommarachupatham) was established in 1904 with a mission to promote knowledge of the culture, history, arts, and natural sciences of Thailand as well as those of neighbouring countries. The premises of the Society in Bangkok, Thailand on Asok Montri Road include a library with many rare books and the Kamthieng House Museum in a historic teak house. The Society has a regular programme of lectures, study trips, cultural events, and music performances. The Society publishes two scholarly journals, the Journal of the Siam Society and the Natural History Bulletin of the Siam Society, and several books. The Society is involved in preserving heritage through the Siamese Heritage Trust. The membership includes people of around 60 nationalities.

== History ==
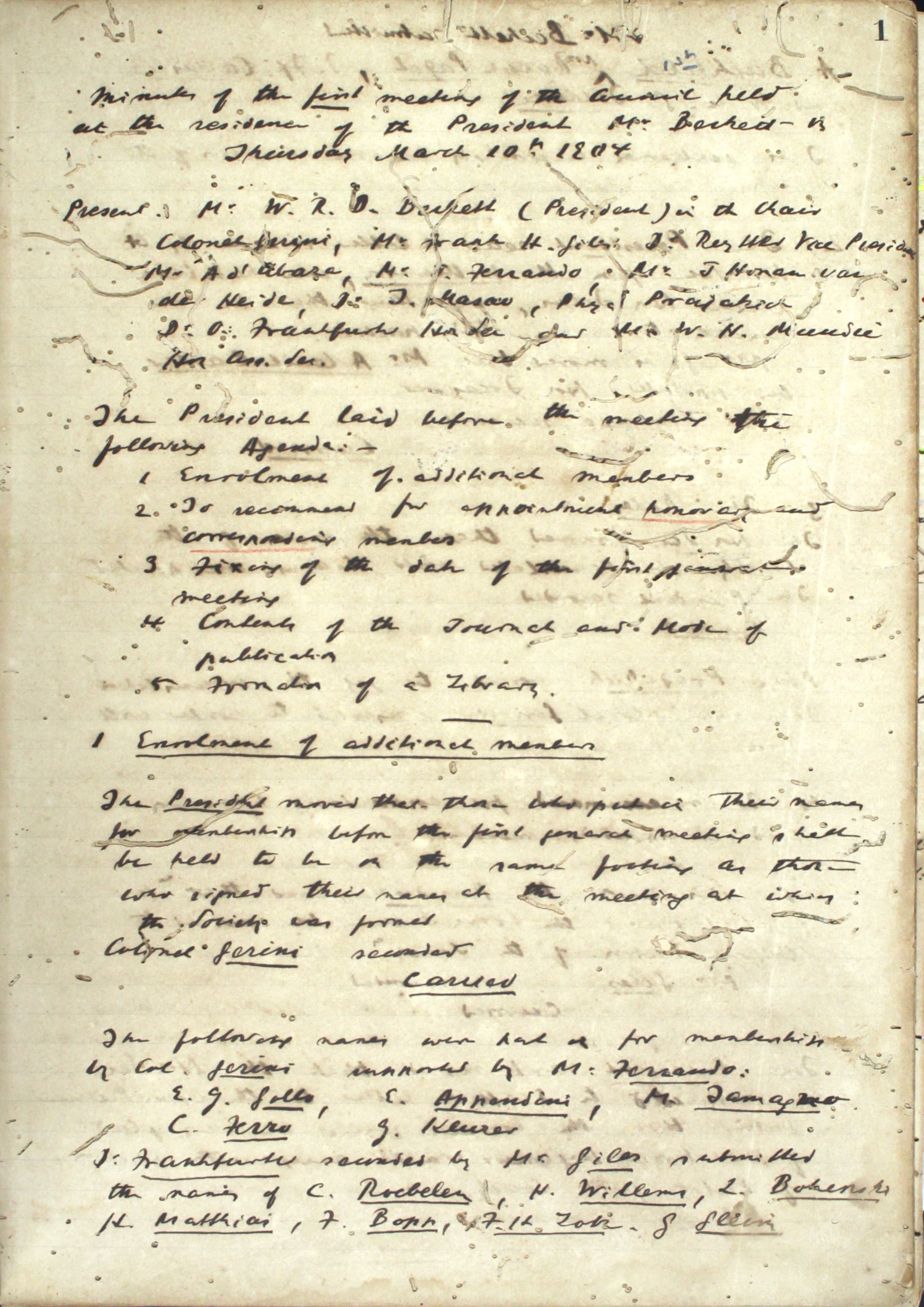
Siam Society Minute Book, first meeting, 10 March 1904

On 26 February 1904, a meeting of some fifty persons at the Oriental Hotel, Bangkok formed the Siam Society. ”The first resolution proposed was to the effect that those there assembled should form themselves into a society for research and investigation in matters appertaining to Siam.” The first meeting of the Society's Council on 10 March 1904 resolved: “The objects of the Society shall be the investigation and encouragement of Art, Science and Literature in relation to Siam and neighbouring countries.” A total of 103 members signed up before the first Annual General Meeting on 7 April 1904.

In 1925, the Natural History Society of Siam, founded in 1913, was merged into the Siam Society.

In 1939, the Society changed its name to the Thailand Research Society in conformity with the nationalist policies of the government of Field Marshal Plaek Phibunsongkhram and the change of the country's name from Siam to Thailand. The change was reversed in 1945.

In 1954, the Society founded a Research Center, funded by donations, including from King Bhumibol Adulyadej, and the Ford Foundation. The Center undertook pioneering research on archaeology, zoology, and the anthropology of minority communities including the Phi Tong Luang or Mlabri people. .

== Emblem and motto ==
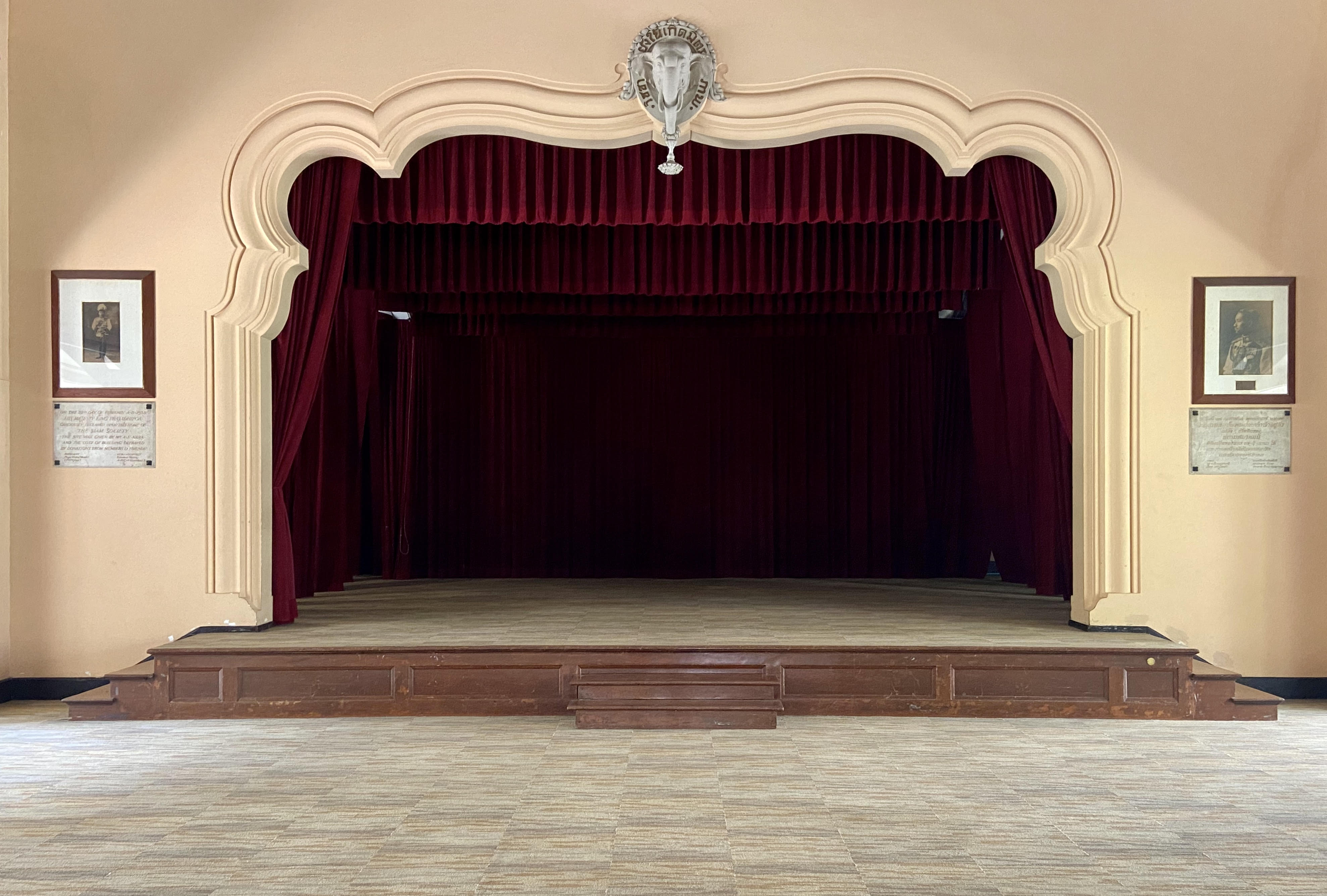
Auditorium stage with emblem above

The emblem of the Society was designed in 1926 by Prince Narisara Nuwattiwong, showing “the head of an elephant holding with his trunk a garland of flowers.” The emblem incorporates a motto, Thai: วิชชายังให้เกิดมิตรภาพ, “Knowledge Gives Rise to Friendship,” composed by Prince Damrong Rajanubhab and Prince Dhani Nivat. The Society explained: “This motto tries to convey the idea that the search for knowledge is the bond which unites the Siamese and foreign members of the Society in a friendly spirit of collaboration.” The emblem first appeared in the Journal of the Siam Society in 1927. A three-dimensional model of the emblem was placed above the stage of the newly built auditorium in 1932.

== Buildings ==
In its early years, the Siam Society rented rooms for meetings, and kept its library at various locations. In 1922, it moved into its first semi-permanent address, on the first floor of the Falck and Beidek Building in Chartered Bank Lane near the Oriental Hotel.

=== Auditorium ===
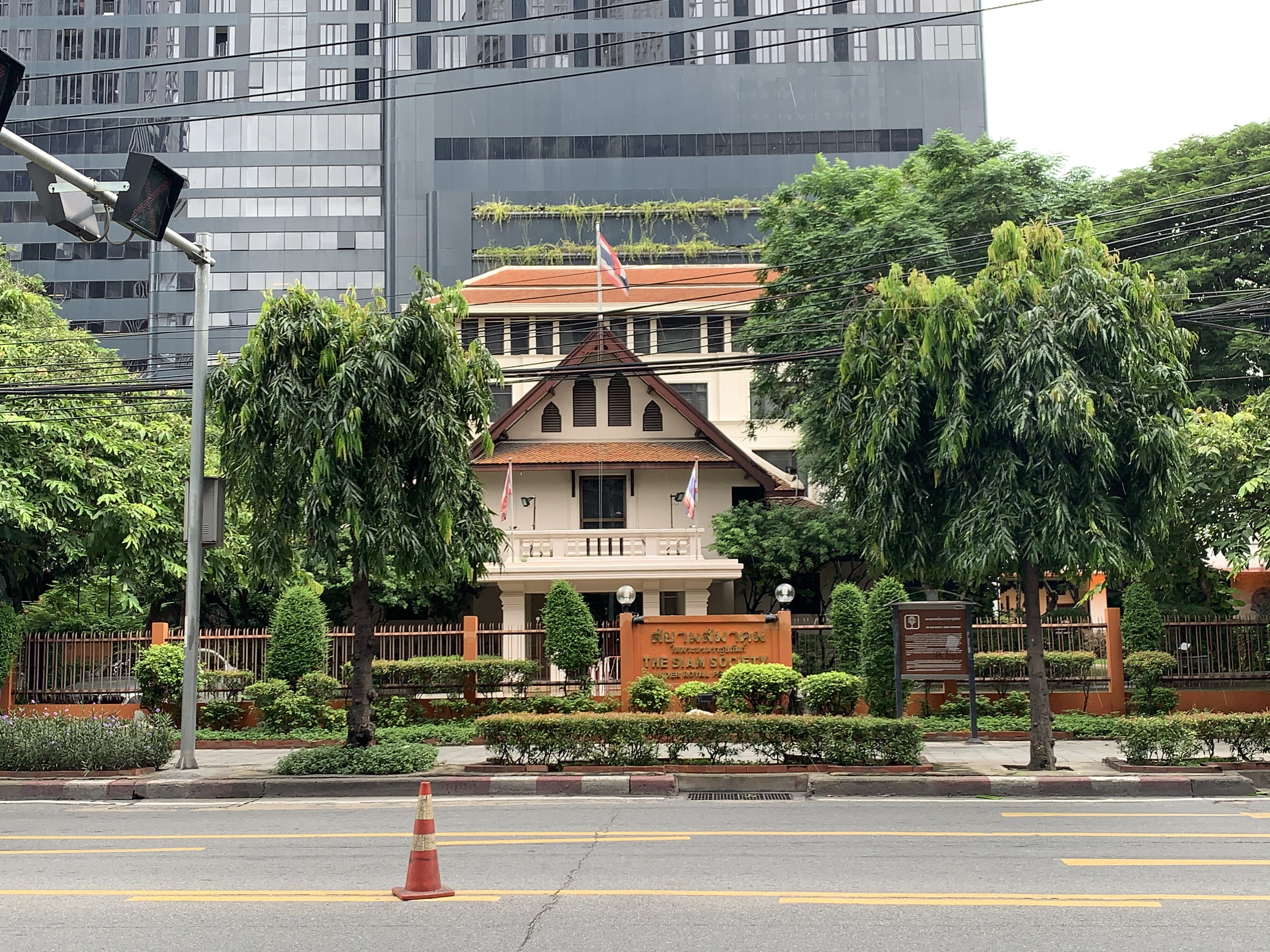
Siam Society Auditorium, seen from the entrance in 2021

In 1931, Ahamad Ebrahim Nana, a businessman of Indian origin born in Thonburi, gifted the Society 3 rai (0.48 hectare) of land on the outskirts of Bangkok. A building, consisting largely of an auditorium and library, was designed by Edward Healy, a British architect, and officially opened on 28 February 1933. The auditorium has a high ceiling and three-metre-high glass doors on each long side that open onto the gardens. A stage is located at the far end, and the interior is decorated with antique carved woodwork from Southeast Asia.

=== Kamthieng House ===
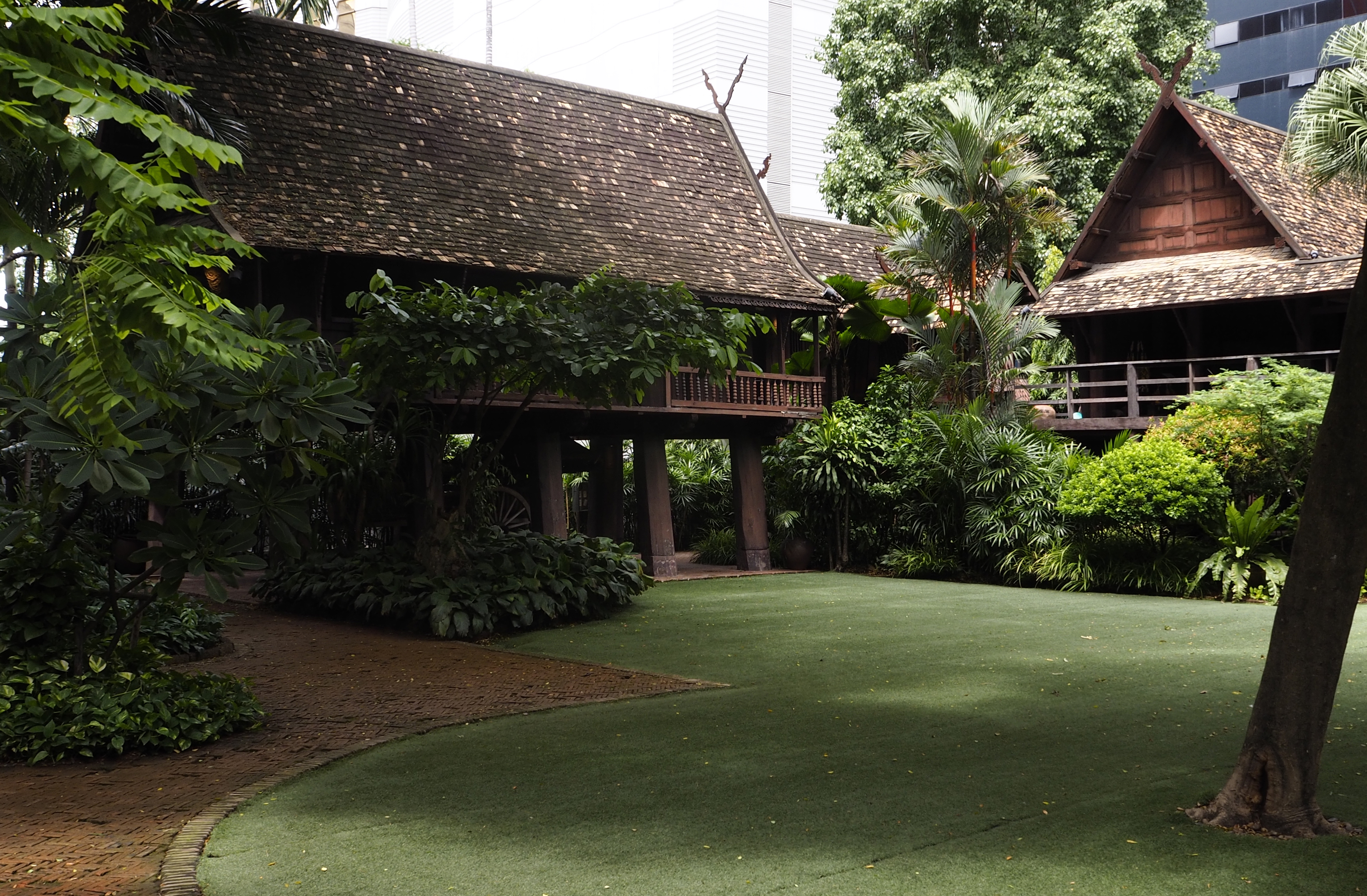
Kamthieng House Museum, Siam Society, Bangkok

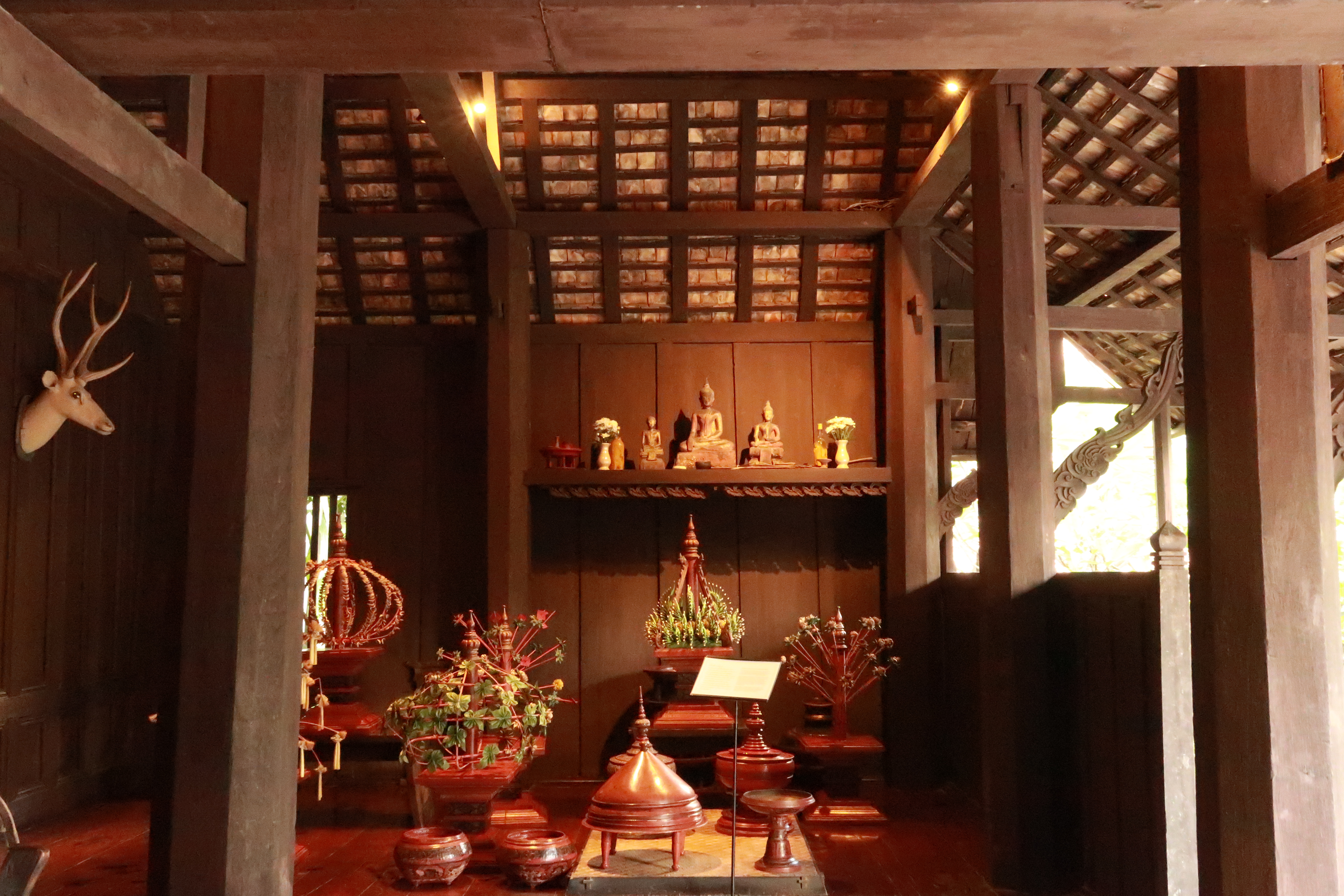
Kamthieng House Museum display

In 1993, Kimhaw Nimmanhaeminda's family of Chiang Mai presented to the Society the Kamthieng House, an outstanding example of old northern Thai architecture, named after her mother, Nang Kamthieng. The teakwood house was originally built in Chiang Mai, in the mid-19th century, on the east bank of the Ping River by Mae Saed, a great-granddaughter of a prince of Mueang Chae. The structure consists of two prefabricated rectangular units with a common floor, a covered veranda and walkway leading to the kitchen, and an open platform – all elevated on 36 octagonal teak pillars. The walls lean slightly outward from the floor to the lower edge of the peaked roof, the ends of which are adorned with V-shaped gablets. A toen (open veranda) was added to the structure, as well as two rice granaries that were acquired from Chiang Mai.

The Kamthieng House houses a museum of the ethnology and arts of Lanna.

=== Saeng Aroon House ===
In 1988, on the occasion of the Society's 84th anniversary, and also in commemoration of her late husband Acharn Saeng Aroon, Khun Lada Ratkasikorn gifted a teakwood house, an excellent example of central Thai architecture.

=== Chalerm Phrakiat Building ===
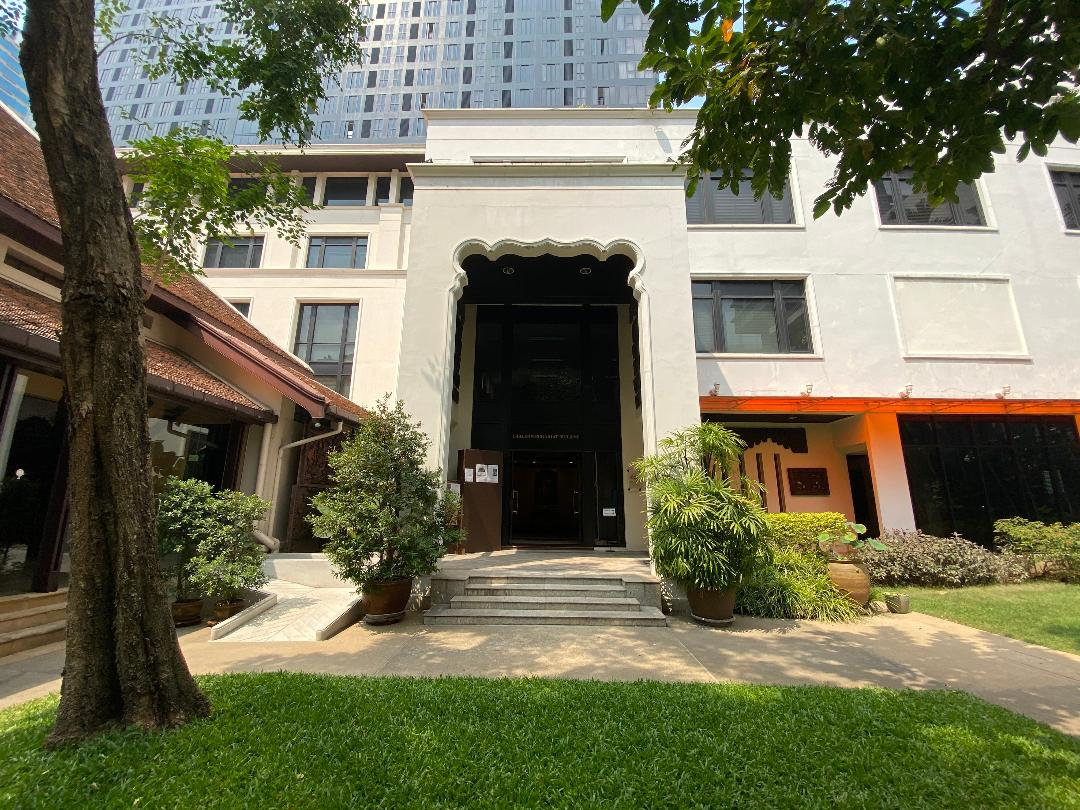
Chalerm Phrakiat Building

The Chalerm Phrakiat building, opened in 1998, was named in honour of the 50th coronation anniversary of King Bhumibol Adulyadej. Major donors to the fund-raising campaign included Princess Galyani Vadhana and the Jim Thompson Foundation.

The building was opened on behalf of King Bhumibol Adulyadej by Crown Prince Vajiralongkorn on 30 September 1998. Designed by Habita Company, the building included space for the library, office, function rooms, and retail areas.

On 20 November 2009, a fire destroyed the office and retail areas in the Chalerm Phrakiat building, and lightly damaged the library. The book collection and the Society's holdings of valuable objects were not damaged.

== Activities ==
Lectures are given in English on an almost-weekly basis, held on weekday evenings, by authors, visiting scholars, leading experts and enthusiasts. The subjects include new archaeological finds, Thai history, antique textile collections, and contemporary Thai artists and designers. Lectures in Thai are usually scheduled on Saturdays during the day.

The Society conducts study trips both within Thailand and overseas. Trips within Thailand are usually 1–3 days in length, and highlight a historical site, cultural performance, or heritage preservation project. The guides are experts from the Society's membership and network.

Musical concerts and cultural performances are regularly staged in the auditorium, and occasionally outside in the grounds. Besides classical music, both Thai and Western, there have been performances of Taiko drumming from Japan, Kathak dance from India, and Flamenco dance from Spain.

In the 1990s, the Society conducted a project on “National Living Treasures,” including performances of music, dance, and puppetry.

=== Conferences and workshops ===
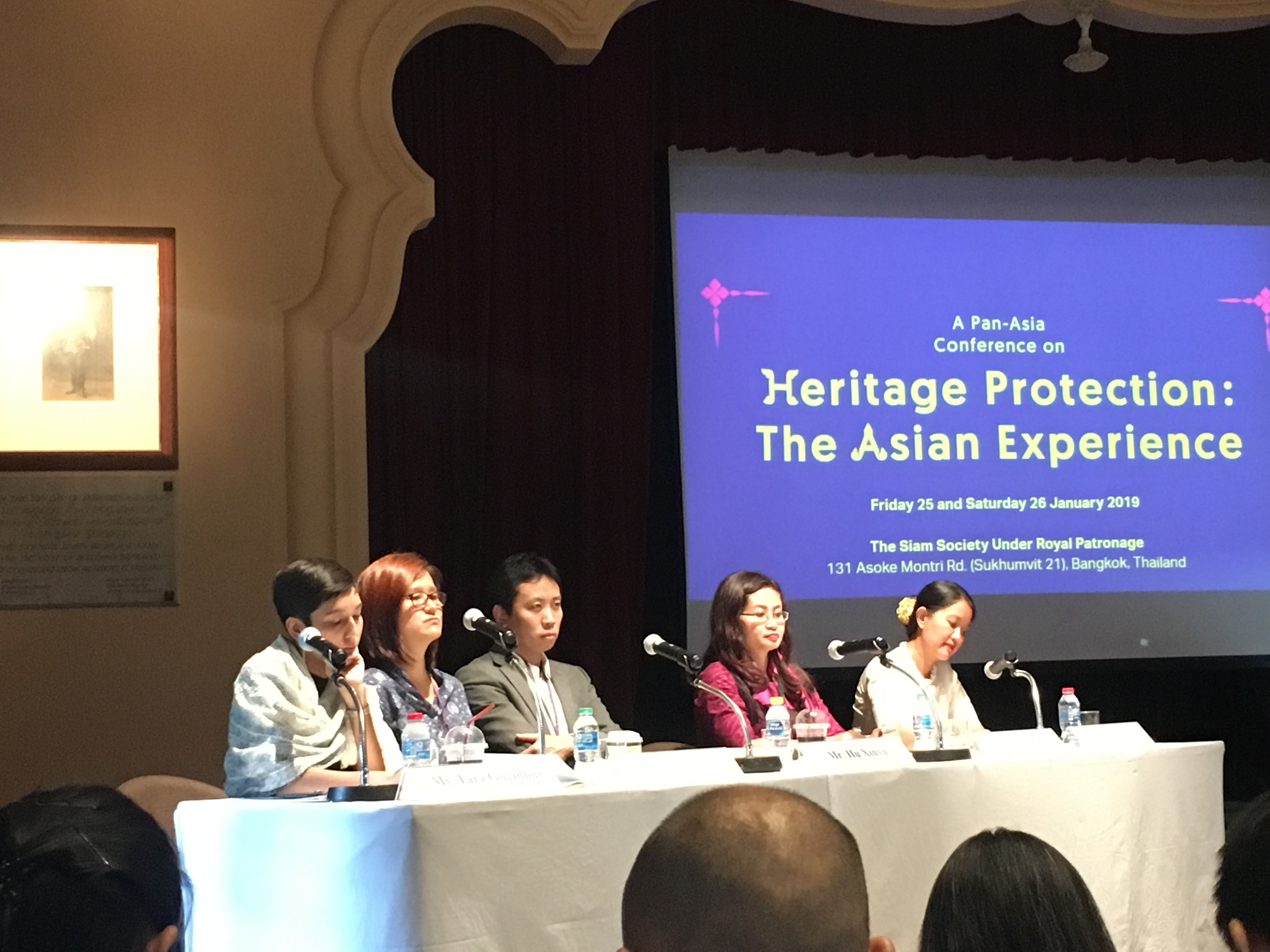
Siam Society Heritage Conference January 2019

The Society has hosted several symposia and international conferences, including a debate on Sukhothai Inscription One in March 1989, an international conference on Culture and Environment in Thailand in August 1997, an international conference in 1997 on King Chulalongkorn’s visit to Europe a century earlier, and a conference on Heritage Protection: The Asian Experience on 25–26 January 2019.

The Society conducts occasional exhibitions and workshops. Exhibitions have featured old books, antique textiles, and historic maps. Workshop subjects include the deciphering of ancient scripts and the appreciation of antique pottery.

=== Collection ===
The Society has assembled a collection of valuable objects as donations from members and others, including 96 pieces of sculpture, 60 religious paintings, 110 pieces of ceramics, 34 ancient maps, 400-plus pieces of textiles, over 700 woodcarvings, plus miscellaneous artifacts including Khon masks and puppets. Many of these pieces are displayed around the Society's premises.

== Heritage ==
The Society has a long-standing commitment to the preservation of natural and cultural heritage. In 1988–89, the Society undertook restoration of the traditional northeastern-style murals in Wat Sra Bua Kaew in Khon Kaen Province.

=== Siamese Heritage Trust ===
Siamese Heritage Trust was established in 2011 to raise the visibility of cultural heritage management as a national issue of general public interest.

The Trust focuses its work on four areas: knowledge, education, advocacy and networking. Programmes under these four areas include public conferences, lectures, study trips, seminars, publications and media opinion pieces.

In 2019, the Trust published a guide to laws on heritage in Thailand as e-books both in English as Heritage Lawyer: Laws for Cultural Heritage Protection and in Thai as Thai: ทนายวัฒนธรรม: ใช้กฎหมายเพื่อคุ้มครองมรดกวัฒนธรรมชุมชน.

== Library ==
The Siam Society library specializes in the fine arts, humanities, social sciences, and natural sciences of Thailand and other countries in Southeast Asia. It is also noted for its outstanding collections of rare books and palm leaf manuscripts.

The collection of rare books assembled by ML Manich Jumsai, including early European works on Siam and the papers of Prince Prisdang, are kept in the library.

== Publications ==
The Siam Society has been a pioneer in the publication of scholarly and scientific books, mainly in English, on a wide range of subjects.

The Orchids of Thailand: A Preliminary List, by Gunnar Seidenfaen and Tem Smitananad, published in six volumes between 1959 and 1965, is recognized as the authoritative work on the subject.

In 2000, the Society published The Royal Chronicles of Ayutthaya: A Synoptic Translation, translated by Richard D. Cushman and introduced by David K. Wyatt, including an English translation of all the known versions of the chronicles at the time.

=== Journal of the Siam Society ===
The Journal of the Siam Society (JSS) publishes original articles of a scholarly nature, in English, on Thailand and neighbouring countries in a wide range of disciplines including archaeology, epigraphy, history, ethnology, religion, language, literature, art and architecture, and performing arts. The Journal has been published continuously since 1904.

In 2012, the complete back-catalog of over two thousand articles and reviews was made available on the internet. Since 2019, the Journal has been listed on the Scopus database of academic journals.

=== Natural History Bulletin of The Siam Society ===
The Natural History Bulletin of The Siam Society (NHBSS) is a biannual publication of scholarly articles in English on the flora and fauna of Thailand and neighbouring countries.

== Structure and governance ==
Members include ordinary members paying an annual fee, life members paying a one-time fee, and honorary members elected by the council. At present, the membership includes people of around sixty nationalities.

The President and Council are elected by life and ordinary members attending the Annual General Meeting, and serve for terms of two years. The affairs of the Society are regulated by the Rules of the Society, originally drawn up in 1904 and amended from time to time.

== Past presidents ==
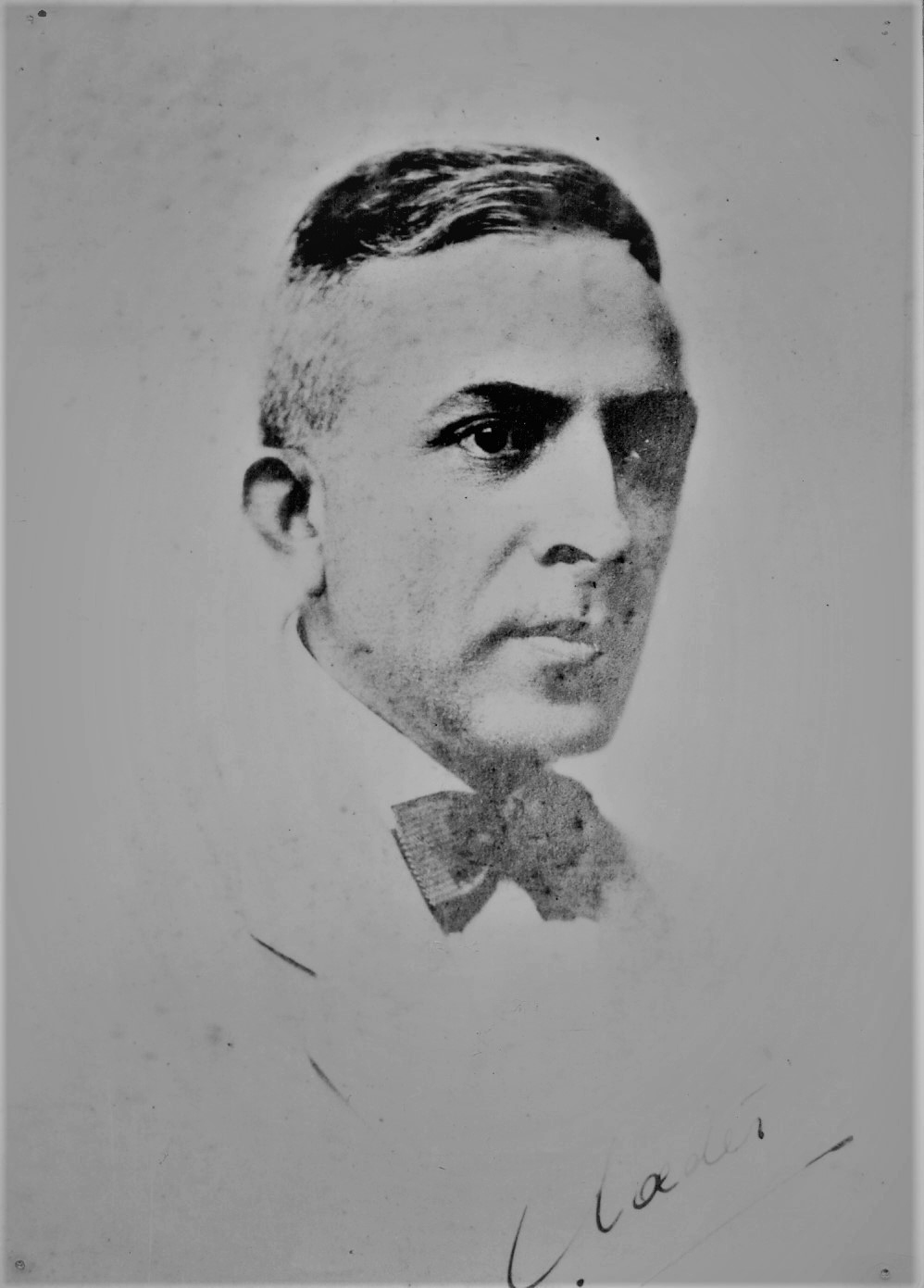
George Coedès

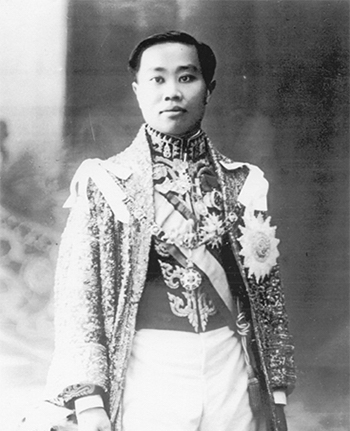
Prince Dhani Nivat

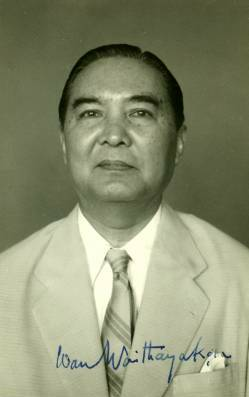
Prince Wan Waithayakon

Past presidents of the Siam Society
President	Years
Mr W. R. D. Beckett	1904–1906
Dr O. Frankfurter	1906–1918
Mr H. Campbell Highet	1918–1921
Mr W. A. Graham	1921–1925
Professor George Coedès	1925–1930
Phya Indra Montri (Francis Giles)	1930–1938
Major Erik Seidenfaden	1938–1940
Prince Dhani Nivat	1940–1944
Prince Wan Waithayakon	1944–1947
Prince Dhani Nivat	1947–1965
Prince Prem Purachatra	1965–1967
Prince Ajavadis Diskul	1967–1968
Phya Anuman Rajadhon	1968–1969
Prince Wan Waithayakon	1969–1976
Professor Chitti Tingsabadh	1976–1979
Prince Subhadradis Diskul	1979–1981
Mom Rachawong Patanachai Jayant	1981–1989
Dr Piriya Krairiksh	1989–1994
Mr Athueck Asvanund	1994–1996
Mr Bangkok Chowkwanyun	1996–1998
Mrs Bilaibhan Sampatisiri	1998–2004
MR Chakrarot Chitrabongs	2004–2006
Mr Athueck Asvanund	2006–2010
Mrs Bilaibhan Sampatisiri	2010–2016
Mrs Pikulkeaw Krairiksh	2016–2020

== Royal associations ==
At the Society's foundation in 1904, Prince Vajiravudh, the future King Rama VI, became the Society's first patron. Subsequently, the reigning king has been the Society's patron. At present Queen Sirikit is Vice-Patron and Princess Maha Chakri Sirindhorn is Vice-Patron and Honorary President.

=== Buddha Footprint ===
In 1990, the Society launched a project to cast a gold Footprint of Lord Buddha based on a wax model made at the time of King Chulalongkorn in honour of the 60th birthday of Queen Sirikit. Funds were raised from over 3,000 donors. The Footprint, using 35 kilograms of gold and measuring 170 x 70 centimeters, was cast in Thonburi, and consecrated by King Bhumibol Adulyadej in a ceremony at Wat Phra Kaew on 22 June 1994.

== Royal visits ==
- On 8 January 1934, King Prajadhipok and Queen Rambai Barni visited the Society's new building.
- On 24 March 1946, King Ananda Mahidol, the future King Bhumibol Adulyadej, and the Princess Mother attended a lecture at the Siam Society delivered by Prince Dhani Nivat
- On 4 December 1954, King Bhumibol Adulyadej and Queen Sirikit visited the Society on the occasion of the Society's Golden Jubilee.
- On 13 January 1962, King Bhumibol Adulyadej, Queen Sirikit, and Queen Rambai Barni, accompanied by Queen Ingrid and King Frederik IX of Denmark, opened the new library building.
- On 26 February 1976, Queen Rambai Barni attended the Society's 72nd anniversary celebration.
- On 22 June 1994, King Bhumibol Adulyadej presided at the royal consecration ceremony for a Gold Footprint of Lord Buddha, cast by the Siam Society.
- On 16 December 1994, Princess Galyani Vadhana laid the cornerstone of the Chalerm Phrakiat Building.
- On 30 September 1998, Crown Prince Vajiralongkorn opened the Chalerm Phrakiat Building on behalf of King Bhumibol Adulyadej.

== Awards ==
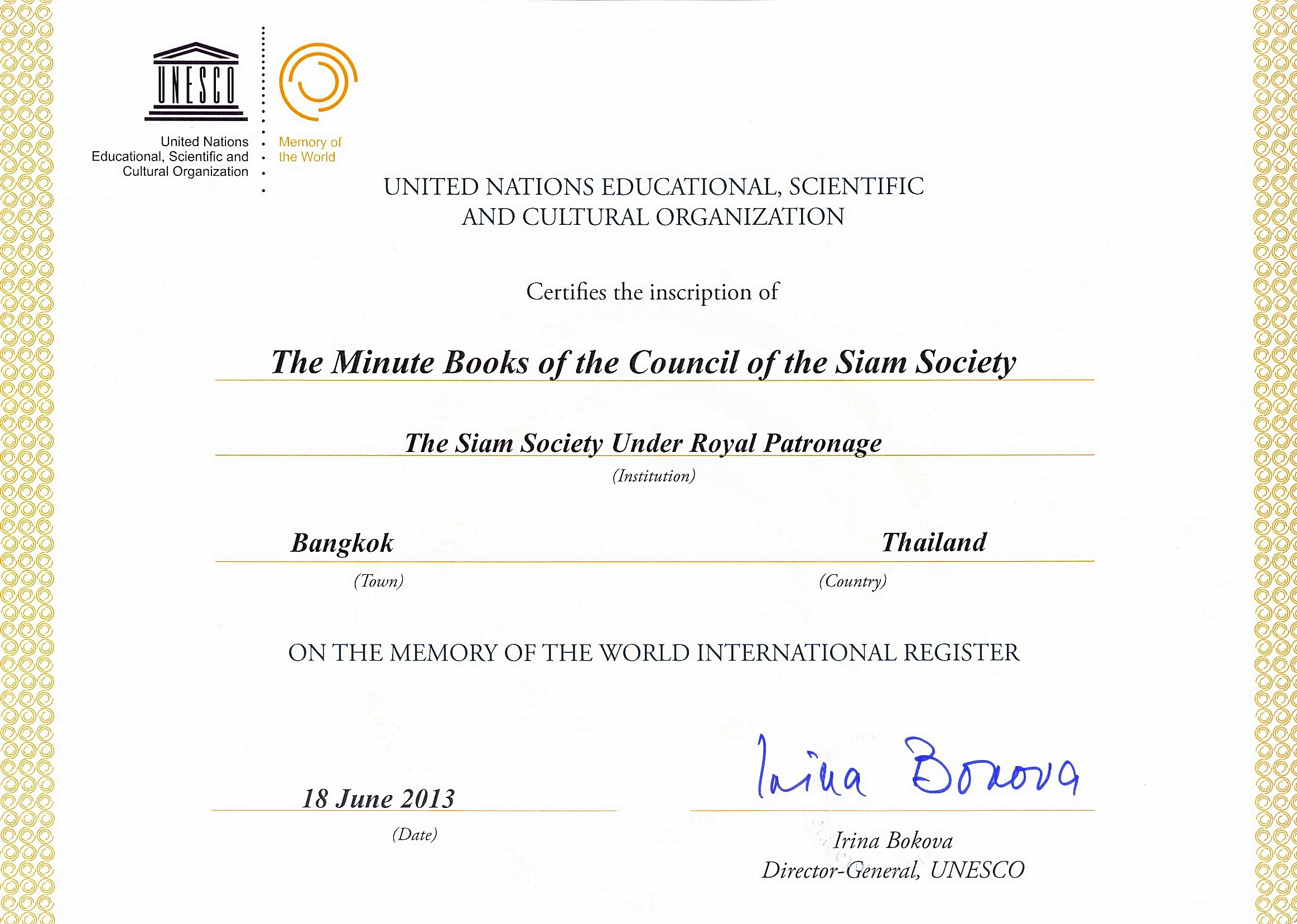
UNESCO Memory of World Certificate for Minutes of the Siam Society, 18 June 2013

In 2002, the Siam Society was cited by the Association of Siamese Architects for excellence in preserving the historically significant buildings within its compound.

In 2012, the Siam Society was awarded “Best Cultural Organisation” status at provincial, regional and national levels by the Ministry of Culture of the Royal Thai Government.

In 2013, the Council Minutes books from 1904 to 2004 were inscribed in UNESCO's Memory of the World International Register. The citation read in part: ”100 years of recording international cooperation in research and the dissemination of knowledge in the arts and sciences…. It reflects the Society's system, process and outcome of work, its obstacles and challenges, the personalities and organizations contributing to its success and the scope of its work in a century of great international changes and development. It testifies to the continuous transactions and cooperation of an international and intellectual nature, among the many generations of people elected to carry out the work of the Siam Society over the long and eventful century.”

In 2014, the Siam Society library was recognized as an “Outstanding Specialist Library” by the Thai Library Association.
