= Walter Ralph Durie Beckett =

British diplomat (1864-1917)

Walter Ralph Durie Beckett CMG
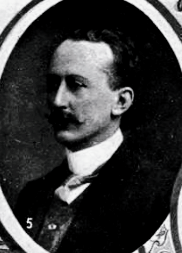
- Beckett ca.1905
- Born: 24 August 1864; Agra
- Died: 19 September 1917 (aged 53); Batavia
- Occupation: Diplomat
- Years active: 1886-1917

Walter Ralph Durie Beckett CMG (24 August 1864 – 19 September 1917) was a British diplomat who served in Siam and the Dutch East Indies.

== Early life and education ==
Son of W. H. Beckett, who served in the Indian Military Works, Walter Ralph Durie Beckett was born on 24 August 1864 in Agra, India. He was educated at Tonbridge School and Scoones's in London. After competitive examination, he was appointed Student Interpreter in Siam.

== Career ==
In 1886, Beckett went to Siam as a Student Interpreter in the consular service, was promoted to Second Assistant in 1888, and to First Assistant in 1891. In 1893, he was appointed Vice-Consul, Bangkok, and for three years directed the affairs of the Consulate, acting on several occasions between 1894 and 1896 as Consul. In 1899, he was appointed Acting Consul at Chiang Mai, and a year later was promoted to Consul of Chiang Mai District.

In 1895, he was sent by the British government on a mission to Trengganu and Kelantan after the British government asked Siam to help capture Malay rebels from Pahang who had fled and were seeking refuge in the states. After meeting with the rulers of the two states with Hugh Clifford, British Resident of Pahang, they agreed to provide assistance, and as a result many of the rebels were captured.

In 1903, he was transferred to Bangkok with the appointment of First Secretary at the Embassy, and on several occasions acted as Chargé d'Affaires. He was involved in the implementation of the terms of the Anglo-Siamese Treaty (1909) which affected the status of British nationals in the kingdom. On 1 July 1913, he was appointed Consul-General. Later that year, he was transferred to Batavia as Consul-General for the Dutch East Indies, where he died while in service on 19 September 1917.

== Personal life ==
Beckett married twice, first to Ivy Nina Goring in London in 1911, and then to Ellen Margaret Terry in Batavia in 1914. He was a founder member of the Siam Society established in 1904, serving as its first president, and a Fellow of the Royal Geographical Society. He was a keen sportsman who regularly played cricket for Bangkok.

== Honours ==
Beckett was appointed Companion of the Order of St Michael and St George (CMG) in the 1909 Birthday Honours.
