= Journal of the Siam Society =

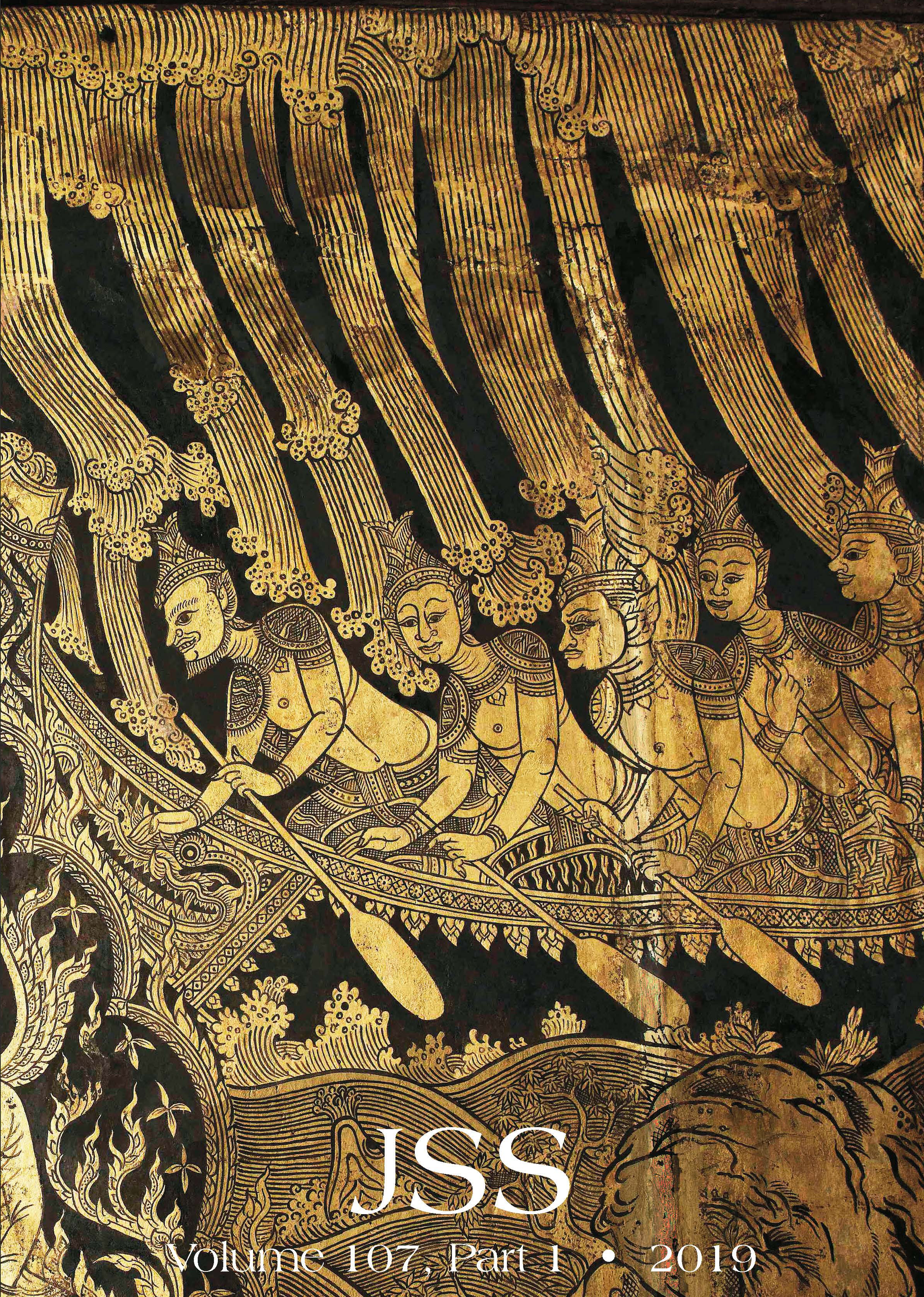
- Discipline: Thai studies
- Language: English

Publication details
- History: 1904–present
- Publisher: The Siam Society Under Royal Patronage (Thailand)
- Frequency: Biannually
- Open access: Yes

Standard abbreviations
- ISO 4: J. Siam Soc.

Indexing
- ISSN: 0304-226X (print); 2651-1851 (web)

Links
- Journal homepage; back issues

The Journal of the Siam Society (JSS) is a scholarly journal published by the Siam Society in Bangkok since 1904.

== History ==
The Journal of the Siam Society is published by The Siam Society Under Royal Patronage in Bangkok, Thailand. At the foundation of the society in 1904, the journal was launched to fulfil the society's purpose:

The objects of the Society shall be the investigation and encouragement of Art, Science and Literature in relation to Siam and neighbouring countries…. For this purpose the Society will convene meetings, at which papers bearing on the objects for which the Society is formed will be read, or lectures given…. Such papers shall, if they are accepted by the Council, be published in a Journal, and the authors of them may, by permission of the Council, republish them in a separate form.

French scholar George Cœdès was the first editor of journal. The first issue of the journal, dated 1904, appeared in August 1905. Publication has been continuous ever since, missing a few issues, particularly during World War II. The number of issues per year has varied between one and four, and is now standardized as two, appearing in May–June and November–December.

The journal publishes original articles of a scholarly nature, in English, on Thailand and neighbouring countries in a wide range of disciplines including archaeology, epigraphy, history, ethnology, religion, language, literature, art and architecture, and performing arts.

In 1939, when the society changed its name to the Thailand Research Society in conformity with the nationalist policies of the government of Field Marshal Plaek Phibunsongkhram, the title of the journal was changed to The Journal of the Thailand Research Society from Vol. 32/1 (Sept. 1940) to Vol. 35/2 (Sept. 1944).

In 2012, the complete back-catalog of over two thousand articles and reviews was made available on the internet. Since 2019, the journal has been listed on the Scopus database of academic journals.

Volume 100, published in 2012, contained 19 commissioned articles on a theme of “Protecting Siam’s Heritage,” and was published separately as a book by Silkworm Books.

== Cover ==
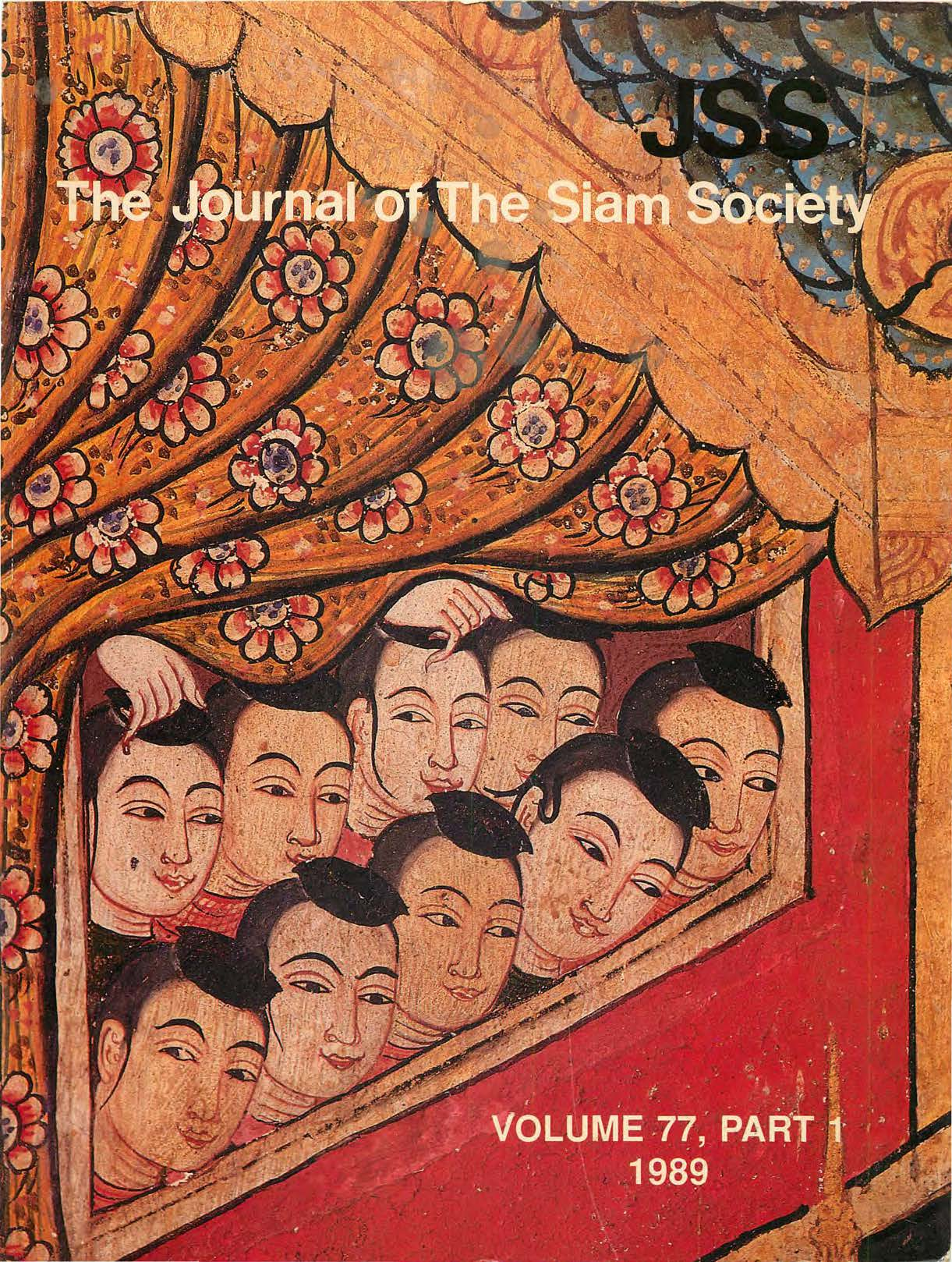
The first pictorial cover

The covers of the early volumes were text-only. The first pictorial cover appeared on Vol. 77/1 (1989), showing: “Detail from a Northern Thai style mural in Wat Phra Sing, Chiang Mai. Photograph by Luca Invernizzi Tettoni.”

== Editorship ==
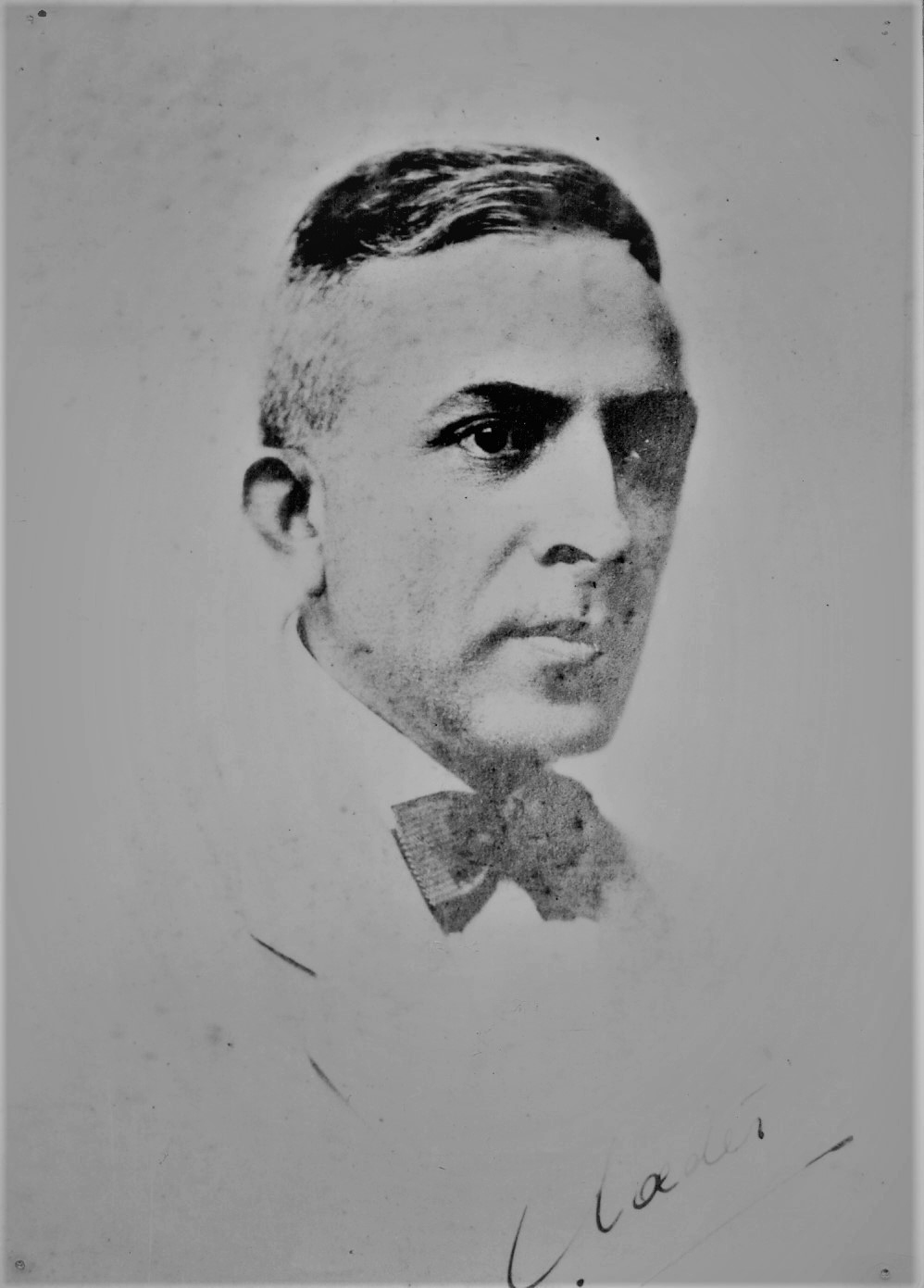
French scholar George Cœdès was the first editor of the Journal of the Siam Society.

The Rules adopted in 1904 provided for the management of the journal as follows:

A Journal shall be published, when practicable, every six months. Four of the Officers, appointed by the Council, shall form the committee of publication, charged with the editing of the Journal and the preparing of papers for publication in the same. One of the members of such Committee shall be appointed presiding officer. The Journal shall comprise a selection of the papers read before the Society, the Report of the Council and Treasurer, and such other matter as the Council may deem it expedient to publish.

At the society's Annual General Meeting on 23 January 1923, it was resolved to appoint an editor for the first time: “The Council shall appoint one of their number as Editor of the Journal, who, as such, shall be responsible for the general arrangement and publication of the material selected by the Council…. Prof. Coedès the Hon. Librarian had kindly consented to become Editor.“

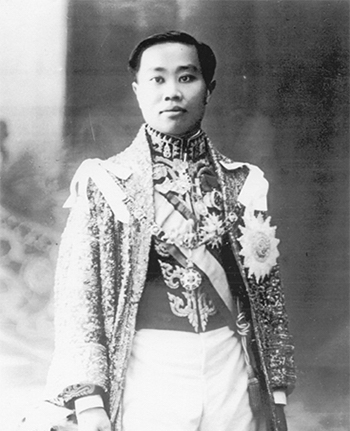
Prince Dhani Nivat

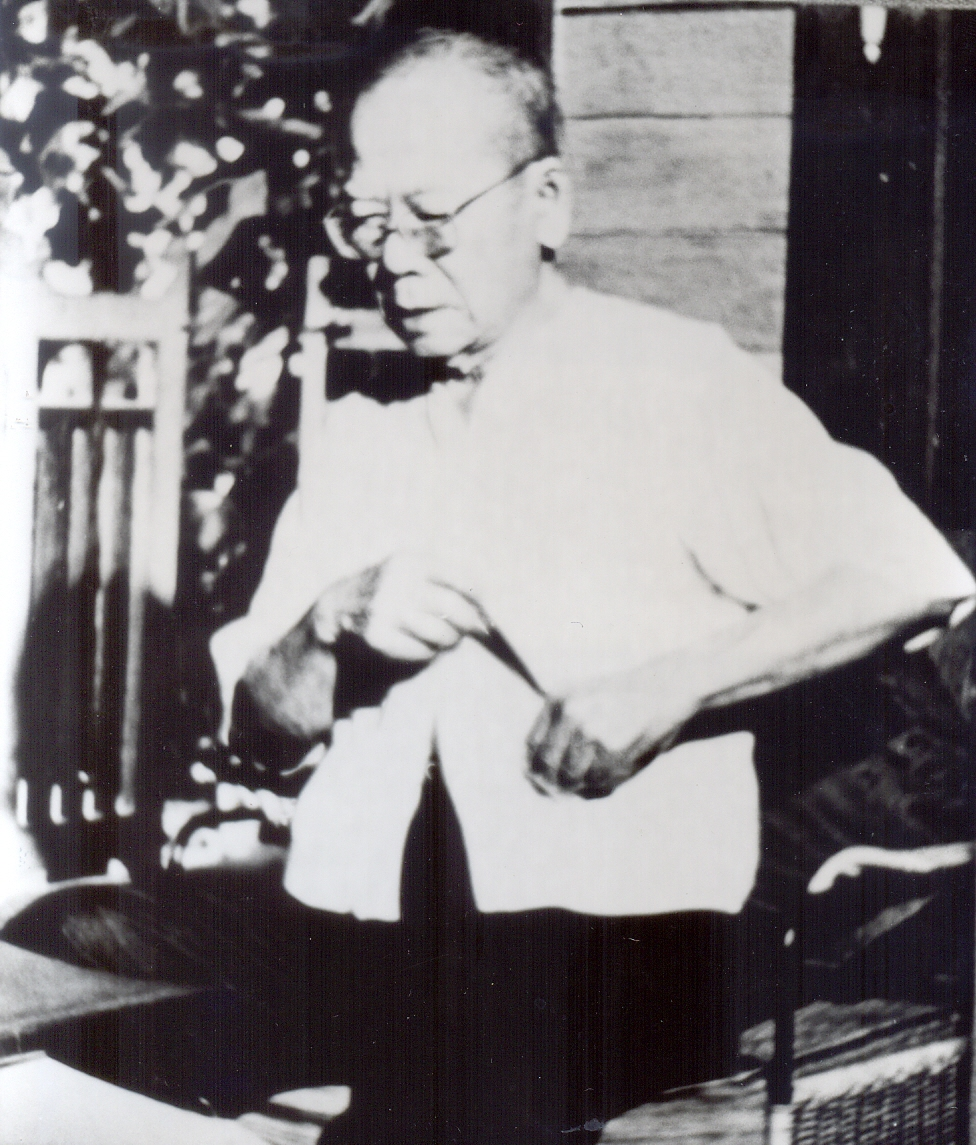
Phraya Anuman Rajadhon

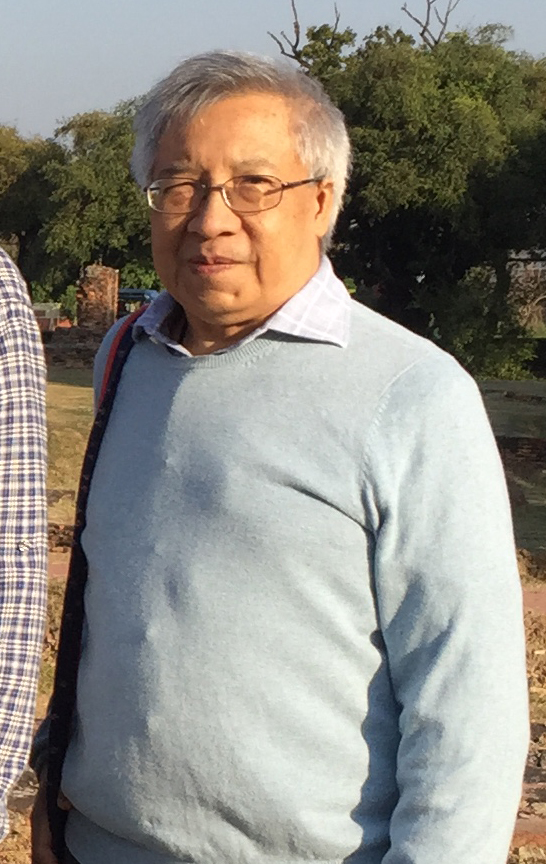
Dhiravat na Pombejra

Past editors of the Journal of the Siam Society
Editor	Years
George Cœdès	1923–1924
E. G. Sebastian	1925
George Cœdès	1926–1928
J. Burnay	1929–1936
Prince Dhani Nivat	1938
J. E. Davies	1939–1940
Prince Prem Purachatra	1942–1946.
J. J. Boeles	1947–1948
Olcott H. Deming	1949
Rolland H. Bushner	1951–1952
A. R. K. Mackenzie	1953
Charles N. Spinks	1956
Cecil F. Stanford	1958–1960
Kenneth J. MacCormac	1961–1965
Larry Sternstein	1966–1969
Michael Smithies	1970–1971
Tej Bunnag	1972–1976
Kim Atkinson	1977–1980
Tej Bunnag	1981–1985
Sulak Sivaraksa	1986–1987
Kaset Pitakpaivan	1988
James V. Di Crocco	1989–1994
Pitya Bunnag	1995–1996
Ian Glover	1997–1998
Ronald D. Renard	1999–2001
Dhiravat na Pombejra	2002–2008

== Content and authors ==
Early issues printed lectures delivered at meetings of the society along with an annual report of the society's activities. Articles other than those read at meetings began to appear in the mid-1930s, along with book reviews. Early articles focused on the history of Siam and exploration of its provinces. Obituaries of prominent members became a regular feature following the obituary of Prince Damrong Rajanubhab in 1944. The size of the journal shrank in the 1940s, then expanded from the mid-1950s with more articles on archeology, anthropology (especially of hill people), and other social sciences.

=== Before World War II ===
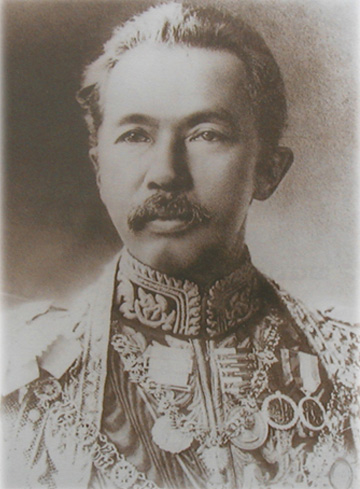
Prince Damrong Rajanubhab

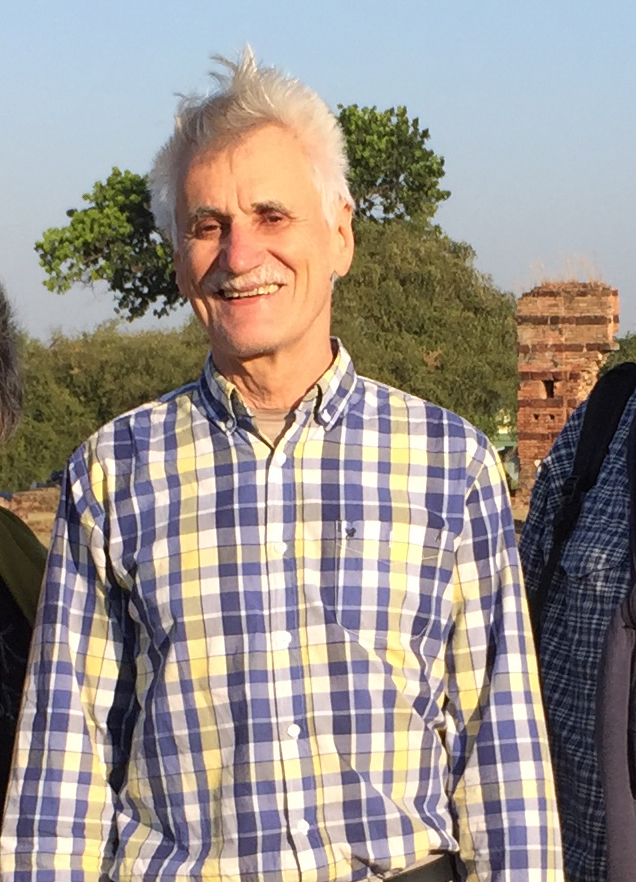
Barend J. Terwiel

Prince Damrong Rajanubhab authored 10 articles between from the first issue in 1904 and 1939. Prince Dhani Nivat authored 17 articles between 1930 and 1965. George Cœdès authored 11 articles between 1918 and 1944. Other prolific contributors in the early years included Jean Burnay and Robert Lingat.

=== King Vajiravudh ===
In 1912, the journal carried an article by King Vajiravudh, Rama VI, on “The Romanisation of Siamese Words.” For some years, the society had discussed the need for a standard system for transcribing Thai into Roman characters. A member, P. Petithuguenin, had proposed a system. In his article, King Vajiravudh proposed an alternative system, which had an “Orientalist” method for transcribing consonants in words derived from Pali-Sanskrit, a parallel and different system for transcribing consonants in “purely Siamese” words, and 30 representations of vowel sounds. The king concluded: “I should be glad to see some sort of uniform system adopted, rather than to have to endure the haphazard and fanciful systems, which not only each body of men but also each individual, seems to use for romanising my language.”

=== After World War II ===
In the post-World War II period, Hans Penth authored 24 articles between 1967 and 2003, though many were short notes. The largest contributors were Michael Smithies, 22 articles between 1971 and 2002, Phraya Anuman Rajadhon, 19 articles between 1951 and 1967, and Michael Vickery, 13 articles between 1973 and 1995, including his translation of the only chronicle text discovered in the 20th century. The largest span was achieved by Barend Jan Terwiel who authored 11 articles over 47 years from 1972 to 2019.

=== Epigraphic and Historical Studies series ===
Between Vol 56/2 (July 1968) and Vol. 67/2 (July 1979), JSS published 26 articles co-authored by A. B. Griswold and Prasert na Nagara. Of these, 24 were in a series of “Epigraphic and Historical Studies,” which provided the first English translations and interpretations of the corpus of inscriptions, mainly from Sukhothai and associated sites. The series was subsequently published by the Historical Society of Thailand. Griswold (1906–1991) was a Baltimore native, Princeton graduate, and investment banker who was parachuted into Thailand behind Japanese lines during World War II. Prasert na Nagara (1918–2018) began his career as an agricultural engineer before discovering his talent and love for languages and history. During the creation of the series, he would spend one month a year working with Griswold at his US home.
