= Lionel Charles Hopkins =

Lionel Charles Hopkins, ISO or L. C. Hopkins (1854–1952) was a British Sinologist noted for his study of the Chinese languages. He was known for his collection of oracle bones that were later donated to Cambridge University Library, where many were discovered to have been forgeries.

Hopkins went to Beijing in 1874 as part of the consular service. In 1898 he was British Consul at Yantai, and in February 1902 he was appointed Consul-General for the Provinces Zhili and Shanxi, to reside in Tianjin. He retired to England by 1910.

The poet Gerard Manley Hopkins was his brother.
