= Thai studies =

Multidisciplinary field of study

Thai studies, a branch of Asian studies, is the multidisciplinary study of Thailand and the Thai peoples. It calls upon the academic disciplines of history, anthropology, religious studies, political science, Thai language, Thai literature, musicology and the physical sciences such as geology.

The first organisation to sponsor and promote Thai Studies was the Siam Society, established in 1904. The Siam Society and the affiliated Siamese Heritage Protection Trust maintain an extensive library of Thai studies materials and exhibits.

The Journal of the Siam Society (JSS) is a peer-reviewed academic journal. Open access to PDF copies of all issues back to 1904 is available online.

The Center for Thai Studies at Chulalongkorn University is a Thai studies center. The Thailand Information Center (TIC) at Chulalongkorn's main library maintains a repository of research materials for Thai studies.

Cornell University was the first active center for Thai studies in the United States. In 1947, Lauriston Sharp began the Cornell-Thailand Project, an initiative to collate baseline data in a comprehensive study of what was then a farming village on the outskirts of Bangkok, now Tambon Bang Chan (Thai: บางชัน) in Bangkok's Khlong Sam Wa District (คลองสามวา).

Outside Thailand, a group of young, active academics at the Royal Melbourne Institute of Technology (RMIT) promoted Thai studies as a research discipline in social studies. The inaugural open-access Thai Studies Journal was launched at RMIT in 2011. RMIT hosted three Thai studies conferences in 2001, 2011, and 2014.

== Institutes and schools ==
Academic

- The Sirindhorn Thai Language Institute, Chulalongkorn University
- The Siam Society, Bangkok

University

- Department of Thai language, Kasetsart University, Bangkok, Thailand
- Department of Thai language, Suan Sunandha Rajabhat University, Bangkok, Thailand
