= Hayward Reader Whitehead =

British Army surgeon

Major-General Sir Hayward Reader Whitehead KCB FRCS
- Born: 14 July 1855; Gawcott, Buckinghamshire, England
- Died: 28 September 1925 (aged 70); Lyndhurst, Hampshire, England

Major-General Sir Hayward Reader Whitehead KCB FRCS (14 July 1855 – 28 September 1925) was a British Army surgeon who had a distinguished career in India, Malta, and during World War I.

== Early life ==
Whitehead was born at Gawcott in Buckinghamshire on 14 July 1855, the son of the Revd. T. C. Whitehead, later head teacher of Christ's College, Finchley. He qualified as a surgeon at Charing Cross Hospital and then worked at the Royal Westminster Ophthalmic Hospital before joining the Royal Army Medical Corps.

== Military career ==
Whitehead rose through the ranks from surgeon Captain to surgeon Major, serving as Assistant Professor of Military Surgery in the Army Medical School at Netley between 1892 and 1896. He served in India from 1897, receiving further promotions to the rank of lieutenant-colonel on 20 May 1898. From February 1903 he was in charge of the Royal Herbert Hospital at Woolwich. In 1909 he was appointed Surgeon General, before moving to Malta in 1915. He was Principal Medical Officer at Salonika until 1917. In July 1918, he became Inspector of Military Hospitals until the end of the war.

== Personal life ==
He married Evelyn Wynne Cayley of Woolston, Hampshire, the daughter of Major Henry Cayley and Letitia Mary Walters on 13 February 1893.

After World War I, he retired to Whinfleld, near Cobham in Surrey. He died at Lyndhurst on 28 September 1925.
