= List of museums and art galleries in Bangkok =

This is a list of notable museums, exhibitions, and in galleries Bangkok.

Name	District	Type	Summary
Ananta Samakhom Throne Hall	Dusit	Historic building	
Baan Sinlapin	Phasi Charoen	Art, Theater	Thai art, performance art (puppetry)
Baan Kao Lao Rueng Museum	Pom Prap Sattru Phai	Historic building	Local history of Charoen Chai
Bang Khun Thien Museum	Bang Khun Thian	Local	Local history, culture, farming
Baan Kudichin Museum	Thon Buri	Historic building	Local history of Kudi Chin
Bangkok Aquarium, Kasetsart University	Chatuchak	Aquarium	
Bangkok Art and Culture Centre	Pathum Wan	Art	Contemporary art
Bangkok Corrections Museum	Phra Nakhon	Prison	Former prison depicting prison life in Thailand
Bangkok Doll Museum	Ratchathewi	Toy	Features over 400 Thai handmade dolls depicting Thai life and culture, as well as costumes from around the world
Bangkok Folk Museum	Bang Rak	History	Lifestyles of middle-class Bangkokians during World War II and its aftermath
Bangkok Kunsthalle	Pom Prap Sattru Phai	Art	Thai and international contemporary art
Bangkok National Museum	Phra Nakhon	Multiple	Thai art and history
Bangkok Noi Museum	Bangkok Noi	Local	Local history, culture
Bangkok Planetarium	Khlong Toei	Science	Astronomy
Bangkok University Gallery	Khlong Toei	Art	Focus is on more obscure and experimental multidisciplinary art
Bang Rak Museum	Bang Rak	Local	Part of Bangkok Folk Museum
Bank of Thailand Museum	Phra Nakhon	Numismatic	History of Thai currency and the Bank of Thailand
Benchamabopit National Museum	Dusit	Religious	Buddhist temple with displays of religious art about Buddha
bit.studio gallery	Pathum Wan	New media art	A gallery at the intersection of Art, Technology, and Science, brought to you by Thai creative technologists studio
Chamchuree Art Gallery	Pathum Wan	Art	Operated by Chulalongkorn University, student art and works by rising artists
Dib International Contemporary Art Museum	Khlong Toei	Art	Contemporary art
Gem and Jewelry Museum	Bang Rak		Gems, minerals, mining, jewelry
Grand Palace	Phra Nakhon	Religious	including the Museum of the Emerald Buddha Temple
H Gallery	Bang Rak	Art	Contemporary art including paintings, photography and textiles from Thai and Asian artists
Hall of Railway Heritage	Chatuchak	Railway	History of trains, includes steam engines, train models, and miniature trains
Jim Thompson House	Pathum Wan	Historic house	Complex of old Thai buildings displaying historic styles and featuring a collection of Asian art and antiques
Kamthieng House Museum	Watthana	Historic house	Run by the Siam Society under royal patronage, 160-year-old traditional teakwood house representing traditional Lan Na Thai way of life
King Prajadhipok Museum	Pom Prap Sattru Phai	Royal life	
King Rama VI Museum	Phra Nakhon	Military history	
M.R. Kukrit's House	Sathon	Historic house	Home of former Prime Minister of Thailand M R Kukrit Pramoj
Madame Tussauds Bangkok	Pathum Wan	Wax	Wax museum
Museum of Animal Parasitology	Pathum Wan	Animal Parasitology	Old U-shape building, Faculty of Veterinary, Chulalongkorn University
Museum of Buddhist Art	Suan Luang	Art	
Museum of Counterfeit Goods	Yan Nawa	Law enforcement	
Museum of Geology	Pathum Wan	Geology	Geology building, ground floor, Department of geology, Faculty of science, Chulalongkorn University
Museum of Human Body	Pathum Wan	Human Body	The first Human Body Museum in Southeast Asia operated by Faculty of Dentistry, Chulalongkorn University
Museum of Imagery Technology	Pathum Wan	Photography	Development of cameras and photography, science and art of photography, operated by Chulalongkorn University
Chulalongkorn University Museum of Natural History	Pathum Wan	Natural History	Biology building 1, Second floor, Faculty of Science, Chulalongkorn University
Museum of Thai Classical Music	Pathum Wan	Thai Classical Music	Central Audio-Visual Education Center, 3rd floor, Mahathirarachanusorn building, Chulalongkorn University
Museum of Thai Medicinal Herbs and Pharmaceutical History	Pathum Wan	Thai medicinal herbs and pharmaceutical history	Osotsala Building, Faculty of Pharmacy, Chulalongkorn University
The Museum of Siam		History	
Nai Lert Park Heritage Home	Pathum Wan	Historic building	Historic home of Nai Lert
National Gallery of Thailand	Phra Nakhon	Art	Classical and contemporary arts of renowned Thai artists
National Museum of Royal Barges	Bangkok Noi	Maritime	
Patpong Museum	Bang Rak	History	History of Patpong from early Chinese settlers to present day
Pediatric Surgery Museum	Pathum Wan	Pediatric Surgery	Sirinthorn Building, ground floor, next to Pahurad lecture room, Chulalongkorn University
Phaya Thai Palace Museum	Ratchathewi	Historic building	
Plai Nern Palace	Khlong Toei	Historic building	
Prasart Museum	Bang Kapi	Art	Private museum with antiques from all Thai periods
Princess Maha Chakri Sirindhorn Anthropology Centre	Thawi Watthana	Ethnography	Regional anthropology, archaeology, history, art history, culture, ceramics
Professor Kasin Suvatabhandhu Herbarium	Pathum Wan	Botany	Botany building, 4th floor, department of botany, faculty of science, Chulalongkorn University
Queen Sirikit Gallery	Chatuchak	Art	Works of acclaimed and young Thai artists
Rare Stone Museum	Pathum Thani Province	Natural history	Gems, minerals, fossils
Royal Elephant National Museum	Dusit	History	Also known as Chang Ton National Museum. Exhibits about the history and role of the white elephant as a royal symbol.
Royal Thai Air Force Museum	Don Mueang	Aerospace	Airplanes and aviation equipment used by the Royal Thai Air Force
Samphanthawong Museum	Samphanthawong	Ethnic	History of early Chinese immigrants
Science Centre for Education	Khlong Toei	Science	Hands-on interactive science and natural history exhibits
Silpakorn University Art Gallery	Phra Nakhon	Art	Operated by Silpakorn University, contemporary art
Silpa Bhirasri National Museum	Phra Nakhon	Art	Modern art
Siriraj Medical Museum	Bangkok Noi	Medical	History of modern medicine in Thailand, exhibits include anatomy, congenital disorders, forensic pathology, pathology, Thai traditional medicine, toxicology
Span's Cultural Gallery	Don Mueang	Art	Arts centre with heritage of Thai and international folk costumes
Suan Dusit Art Gallery	Dusit	Art	
Suan Pakkad Palace	Ratchathewi	Art	Groups of traditional Thai houses displaying antiquities, sculpture, musical instruments, decorative artifacts; includes the Marsi Gallery
Tadu Art Gallery		Art	Thai contemporary art and culture
Tang's Gallery		Art	Chinese and international contemporary art
Thai Art Gallery		Art	In Siam Paragon
Thai Bank Museum	Chatuchak	Economics	Evolution and development of the country's financial and banking systems
Thai Flag Museum		History	
Thai Handicraft Museum	Dusit	Art	
Thai Human Imagery Museum		History	In Nakhon Pathom Province, fiberglass figures reflecting Thailand's history
Thai Labour Museum		History	History of the labour movement in Thailand
Thai Life Permanent Exhibition Hall		History	In the Thailand Cultural Centre; history of the Thai people and different aspects of Thai culture
Thai Philatelic Museum	Phaya Thai	Philately	Stamps and the postal system
Thainosaur Museum	Bang Kho Laem	Natural history	Paleontology
Thavibu Gallery		Art	Thai, Vietnamese, and Burmese contemporary art
Siam Ocean World		Natural history	In Siam Paragon, aquarium
Snail Museum of Thailand	Pathum Wan	Snail museum	Second floor, room 218, Biology building (white building), faculty of science, Chulalongkorn University
Varadis Palace		Historic house	
Vimanmek Palace	Dusit	Historic house	Former royal palace of King Rama V, features mementos, photographs, personal art and handicrafts, and serves as a showcase of the Thai national heritage
Sombat Permpoon Gallery	Watthana	Art Gallery	The largest commercial art gallery in Thailand. Founded in 1979 is one of Thailand's leading collectors of Thailand's national artists.
Rock Around Asia Gallery	Novotel Hotel Suvarnabhumi Airport	Art Gallery	Southeast Asian art, contemporary art, khon masks, marbles, paintings, earthenware
Wajawittayawatt Museum	Pathum Wan	Dental machines and devices	Wajawittayawatt Building, first floor, Faculty of Dentistry
West Eden Gallery	Watthana	Art Gallery	Contemporary Art
Richard Koh Gallery	Watthana	Art Gallery	Contemporary South East Asian Art
SAC Gallery	Watthana	Art Gallery	Contemporary South East Asian Art
Bangkok CityCity	Sathorn	Art Gallery	Contemporary Thai Art
La Lanta Fine Art	Yan Nawa	Art Gallery	Contemporary Art
Nova Contemporary	Pathum Wan	Art Gallery	Contemporary Art
Over The Influence	Samphanthawong	Art Gallery	Contemporary Art

== Defunct museums ==
- Children's Discovery Museum
- Bangkok Fashion Trend Center

== See also ==
- List of districts of Bangkok
- List of museums in Thailand
