= Tourism in Bangkok =

Bangkok, the capital of Thailand, is one of the world's top tourist destination cities. Each year, approximately 22.7 million international visitors arrive in Bangkok. MasterCard ranked Bangkok as the world's top destination city (by international visitor arrivals in its Global Destination Cities Index), with 15.98 million projected visitors in 2013. It topped the MasterCard Global Destinations Cities Index as the most visited city in the world in 2012, 2013, 2016, 2017 and 2018. The city is ranked fourth in cross-border spending, with 14.3 billion dollars projected for 2013, after New York, London and Paris. Euromonitor International ranked Bangkok sixth in its Top City Destinations Ranking for 2011. Bangkok has also been named "World's Best City" by Travel + Leisure magazine's survey of its readers for four consecutive years since 2010.

As the principal gateway for arriving visitors, Bangkok is visited by the majority of international tourists to the country. Domestic tourism is also prominent. The Department of Tourism recorded 26,861,095 Thai and 11,361,808 foreign visitors to Bangkok in 2010. Lodgings saw 15,031,244 guests, who occupied 49.9 percent of the city's 86,687 hotel rooms. Chinese visitors spend a lot of money and most goes to retailers in Bangkok. Chinese visitors stayed an average of one week in Thailand, spending US$1,000-1,300 each or US$167 per day each.

Bangkok's sights, attractions, and city life appeal to diverse groups of tourists. Royal palaces and temples as well as museums constitute its major historical and cultural tourist attractions. Shopping and dining experiences offer a range of choices and prices. The city is also famous for its nightlife. Although Bangkok's reputation for sex tourism is well established, it is downplayed by the government.

== Palaces and wats ==
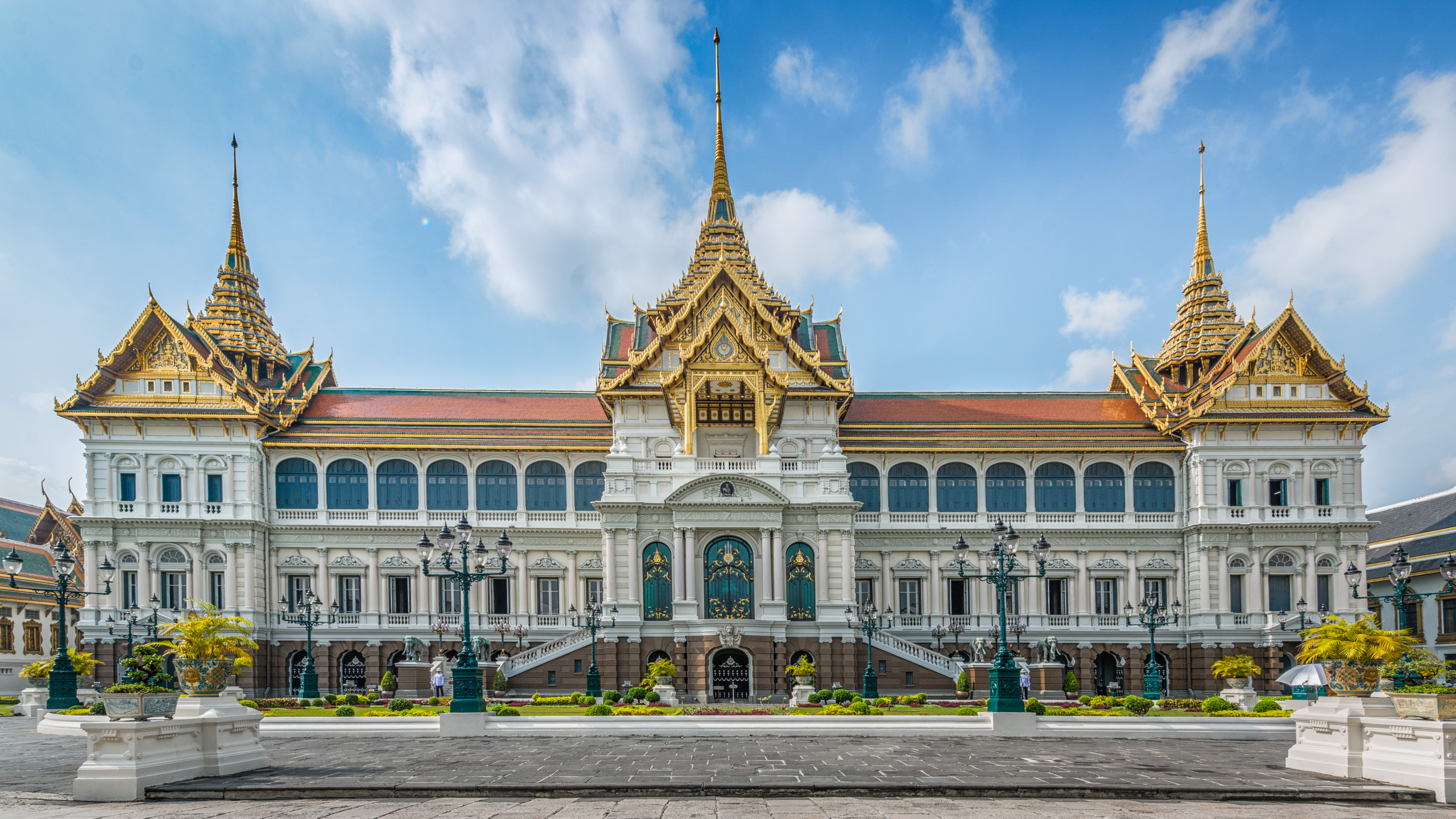
Chakri Maha Prasat Throne Hall, a 19th-century European-style building with a traditional Thai roof, is in the Grand Palace compound.

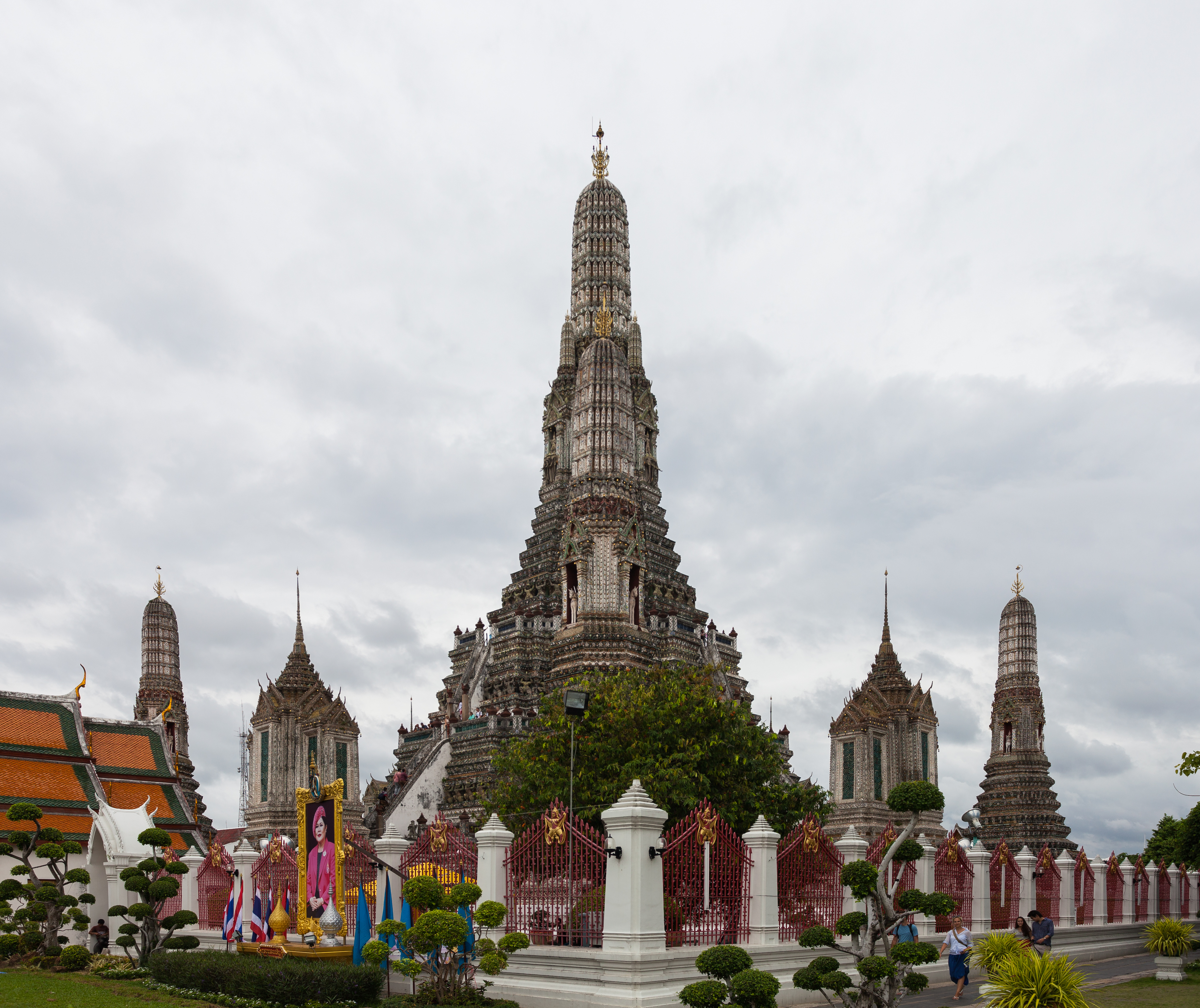
Wat Arun, one of the most visited temples in Bangkok

Bangkok, the centre of the Bangkok Metropolitan Area, has been the capital of Thailand since 1782, when the seat of government was moved across the Chao Phraya River from the Thonburi (west bank) side of the river. There are many palaces in the city, some still used by the Thai royal family, while others are now open to the public. A number have become government or academic buildings as well as museums. The king's official residence is the Grand Palace, which has housed Thailand's monarchs for over 200 years. Before the 1932 Revolution ended absolute monarchy, the complex was the home of Thai government: it included royal courts and administrative branches, similar to the earlier capital at Ayutthaya. It houses Chakri Mahaprasat Hall and Wat Phra Kaew, which contains the Emerald Buddha, considered the most important temple in Thailand. However, the more modern Chitralada Palace was the actual Bangkok residence of the previous monarch, King Bhumibol Adulyadej (Rama IX), and his Queen Sirikit.

Of the hundreds of Buddhist temples (or wats) in Bangkok, only a few are of much interest to tourists. When King Taksin led his troops out of Ayutthaya and into Thonburi in 1767 CE, they took refuge in Wat Arun. The most prominent feature is a tall chedi built in the 1820s that stands 85 meters (279 ft). It was tallest structure in Bangkok until modern skyscrapers were built a few decades ago.

Wat Pho, also known as the Temple of the Reclining Buddha or Wat Phra Chetuphon, is south of the Temple of the Emerald Buddha and the Grand Palace. It is Bangkok's largest temple and contains a huge reclining Buddha figure that is 46 metres (151 ft) long and is covered with gold leaf. The feet alone are 3 metres (10 ft) in size.

Wat Suthat is one of the oldest temples and the site of the Giant Swing, formerly used in an annual Brahman ceremony. A huge teak arch from which the swing was hung still stands in front of the temple.

Wat Saket, or the Golden Mount (Phu Khao Thong in Thai), houses relics of the Buddha in a 58-metre-high chedi surmounted by a golden cupola. Built by King Rama I just outside the new city's walls, the temple served as the main crematorium. In the century after its construction, some 60,000 plague victims were either cremated there or placed outside for vultures to devour.

=== Public parks ===
Queen Sirikit Park (สวนสมเด็จพระนางเจ้าสิริกิติ์): It was built to commemorate the 60th birthday of Queen Sirikit. A big pool in the park contains three fountains and a fine collection of both Thai and foreign lotuses.

Lumphini Park (สวนลุมพินี): This was a huge open space once belonging to King Rama VI, who issued a royal command to turn the area into a public park as a gift to Bangkok residents.

Princess Mother Memorial Park (อุทยานเฉลิมพระเกียรติสมเด็จพระศรีนครินทราบรมราชชนนี): It was built near the Wat Anongkharam community where Somdej Phra Srinagarindra Boromarajajonani, the Princess Mother, had resided during her childhood. The park includes a full-scale model of the Princess Mother's house and old buildings renovated as exhibition halls displaying the life of the Princess Mother as well as the history of the Wat Anongkharam community.

Nagaraphirom Park (สวนนาคราภิรมย์): The small public park with good atmosphere behind Grand Palace by the Chao Phraya River in the area between Tha Tian and Tha Chang

Santichaiprakarn Park (สวนสันติชัยปราการ): A small public park by the Chao Phraya River in the Bang Lamphu area. Located of Phra Sumen Fort, beautiful Santichaiprakarn Throne Hall, and last mangrove apple in Bangkok.

== Museums ==
Chulalongkorn University (พิพิธภัณฑ์ในจุฬาลงกรณ์มหาวิทยาลัย) comprises several museums located around the university such as Museum of Human Body, Museum of Imagery Technology, Museum of Animal Parasitology, Museum of Geology, Museum of Natural History, Snail Museum of Thailand and more.

The National Gallery Museum (พิพิธภัณฑสถานแห่งชาติ หอศิลป) is the former location of the Royal Thai Mint and exhibits collections of both traditional Thai and contemporary art. A number of oil paintings made by the King in his earlier years are exhibited here.

The National Museum (พิพิธภัณฑสถานแห่งชาติ พระนคร) is housed in former palace of the Wang Na or second king, Kromphraratchawangbowon Mahasurasinghanat, the designated heir to the throne in former years. Built simultaneously with the Grand Palace for Rama I's brother, the complex contains several major throne halls: Phra Thinang Siwamok Phiman, Phra Thinang Phutthaisawan, and Phra Thinang Itsara Winitchai.

Rattanakosin Exhibition Hall (นิทรรศน์รัตนโกสินทร์) recounts the rich history of Bangkok's inner city, also known as Rattanakosin Island, with modern presentation methods. One of Bangkok's newest museums, opened in 2010 on Ratchadamnoen Avenue close to Wat Ratchanatdaram.

Suan Pakkad Palace (วังสวนผักกาด) is a complex of eight Thai-style houses was once the residence of one of Thailand's leading art collectors, Prince Chumbhot of Nagara Svarga. It contains an extensive collection of Asian art and antiques, including items from the prehistoric Ban Chiang civilisation, and a collection of rare seashells. The Khon (classical Thai masked dance) Museum and the Traditional Thai Music Museum are also here.

The Vimanmek Mansion Museum (พระที่นั่งวิมานเมฆ) is the world's largest golden teak. It was built on Ko Chang by King Rama V, but was moved to the compound of the Dusit Palace on Ratchawithi Road when 19th century French imperialists threatened the original location. The three-storey royal mansion has 81 rooms, halls, and ante-chambers, all containing royal memorabilia from the fifth reign. Royally-sponsored Thai art masterpieces are also on display near Vimanmek at the Ananta Samakhom Throne Hall (พระที่นั่งอนันตสมาคม) as part of the "Arts of the Kingdom" exhibition.

The Siriraj Medical Museum, in the Siriraj Hospital on the west bank of the Chao Praya, is a large six-section medical museum with diverse exhibits on medicine in general, forensic medicine, and the history and present state of medical profession in Thailand. Often overlooked by tourists, the exhibits are a valuable resource for both medical professionals and interested laypersons.

Siriraj Bimuksthan Museum, in the area of Siriraj Piyamaharajkarun Hospital next to the Chao Praya River, is a museum that exhibits Rear Palace which is its original location from the early Rattanakosin period and later, Bangkok Noi Railway Station with has a history related to World War II.

Bangkok Noi Museum, the museum shows the way of life of Bangkok Noi people since the past. Which Bangkok Noi District is considered to be one of the longest historical districts in Bangkok.

The Museum of Siam, on Chanamchai Road, focuses on the provenance of people of Thailand with a focus on the people of Bangkok.

Khaosan Museum, The history of Khaosan Road and its environs. The museum depicts the way of life and history of Khaosan Road in the days before it became a byword for backpackers from around the world. It is on the 2nd floor of Kraichitti's house.

Bangkokian Museum, the live of people during the past 100 years is well-preserved in this museum. The house of Warapon Suvadee was transformed into this museum designed to keep the heritages to the future generations.

National Museum of Royal Barges, is a museum for storing the royal vessels used in the Royal Barge Procession, which is an ancient tradition since the Ayutthaya period. Currently under the supervision of the Royal Thai Navy.

Wat Traimit Museum, located on the top floor of the chapel of Wat Traimit, the temple that enshrined the largest golden Buddha statue in the world. It exhibits the history and lifestyle of overseas Chinese who lived in Sampeng in the past. Which is the location of the temple at this time is the current Yaowarat or better known as Chinatown.

Ban Mo Wan, was created by Mo Wan or Wan Rodmuang under the traditional Thai medicine who lived in the reigns of King Rama V - VIII (1870 - 1945). In the past, the physician lived at the intersection of Unakan Road (a Charoen Krung Road in the present) and later moved near to the Giant Swing on the current location. It is a colonial-style old building, which is a house as well as a traditional Thai medicine shop that has been inherited for more than 4 generations. The building is still filled with antiquities that tell the story of the past as well as the ancient medicine over a hundred years. It has been very popular in the past and the medicine production process is still being relayed in a traditional way by the old equipments with the age of hundred over years.

The Museum of Floral Culture is a museum located in Dusit District near Vimanmek Mansion, a complex of Dusit Palace. It occupies the two floors of a 100-year-old colonial house and is surrounded by a garden. Its dedicated to the history and techniques of floral arrangements in wedding or religious ceremonies, official occasions and royal events.

=== Cruise ===
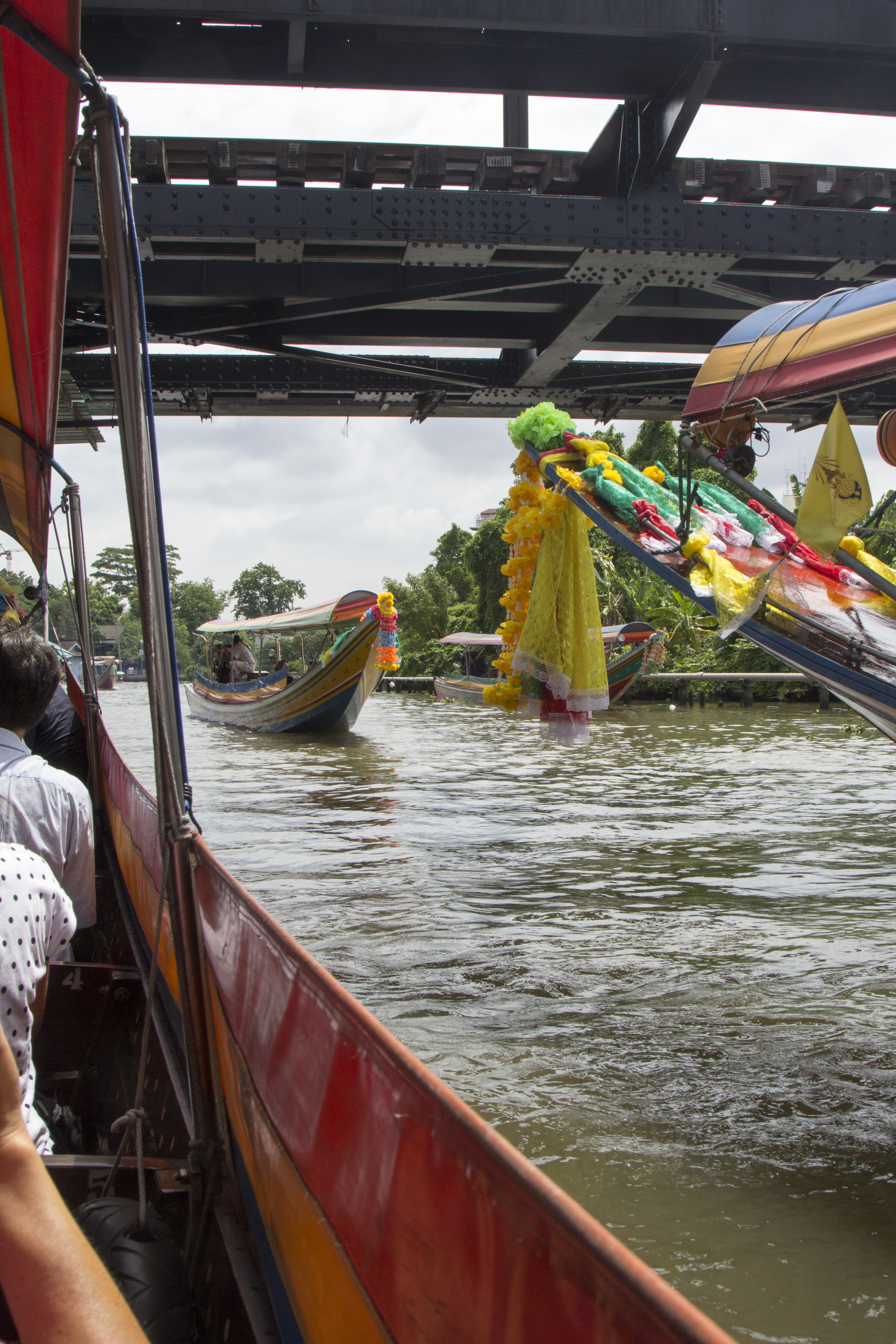
Tour tourists on the canal

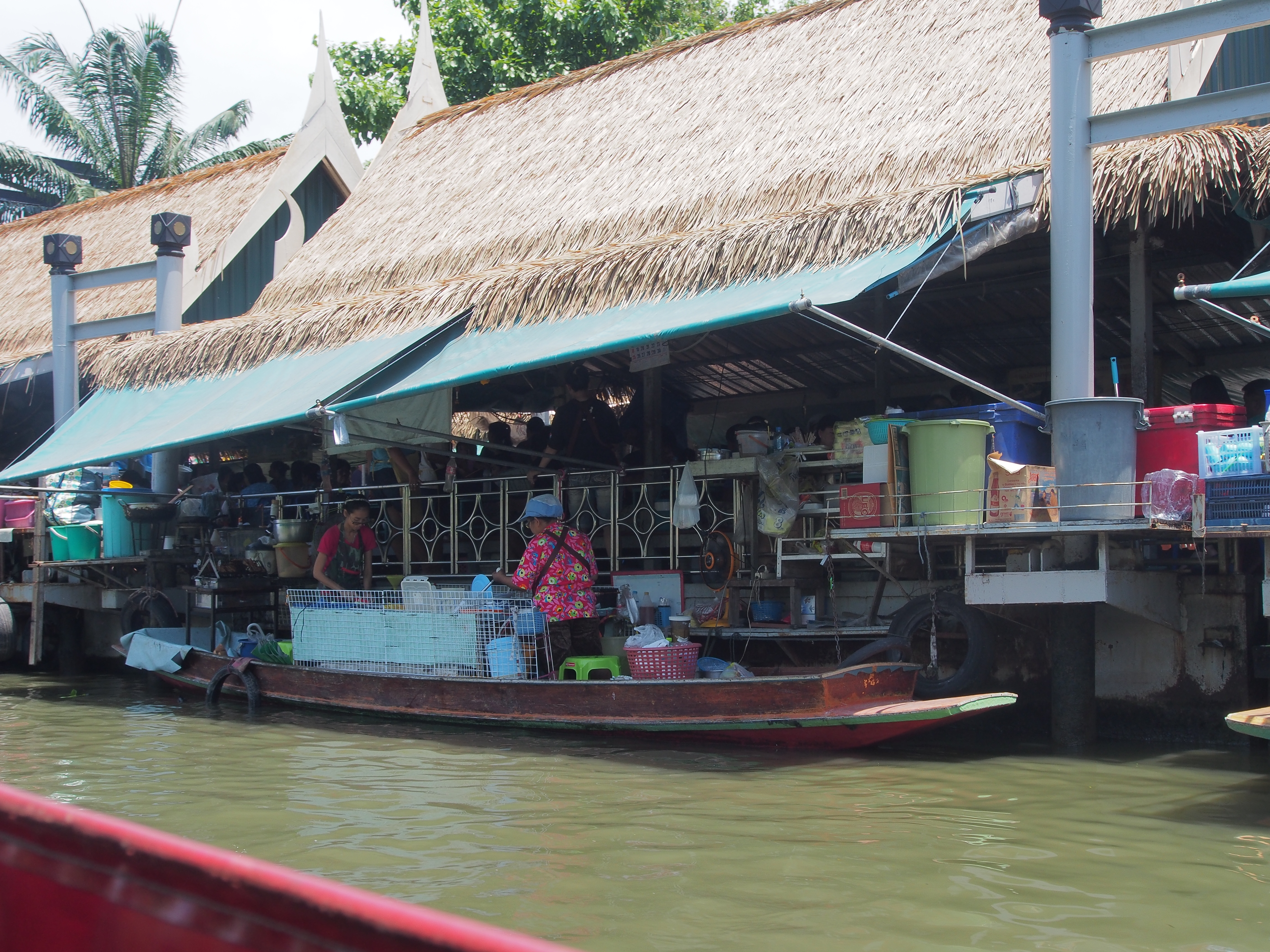
Waterfront eateries and way of life of the people one will see when cruising along the various canals of Bangkok

The Chao Phraya River & Bangkok's Canals (khlongs): Nineteenth-century Bangkok was laced with canals, giving the capital the appellation "Venice of the East". Surviving canals and the Chao Phraya River provide a glimpse of a traditional waterborne way-of-life that has remained essentially unchanged over centuries. The river and canals may be explored by chartered boat or cruise.

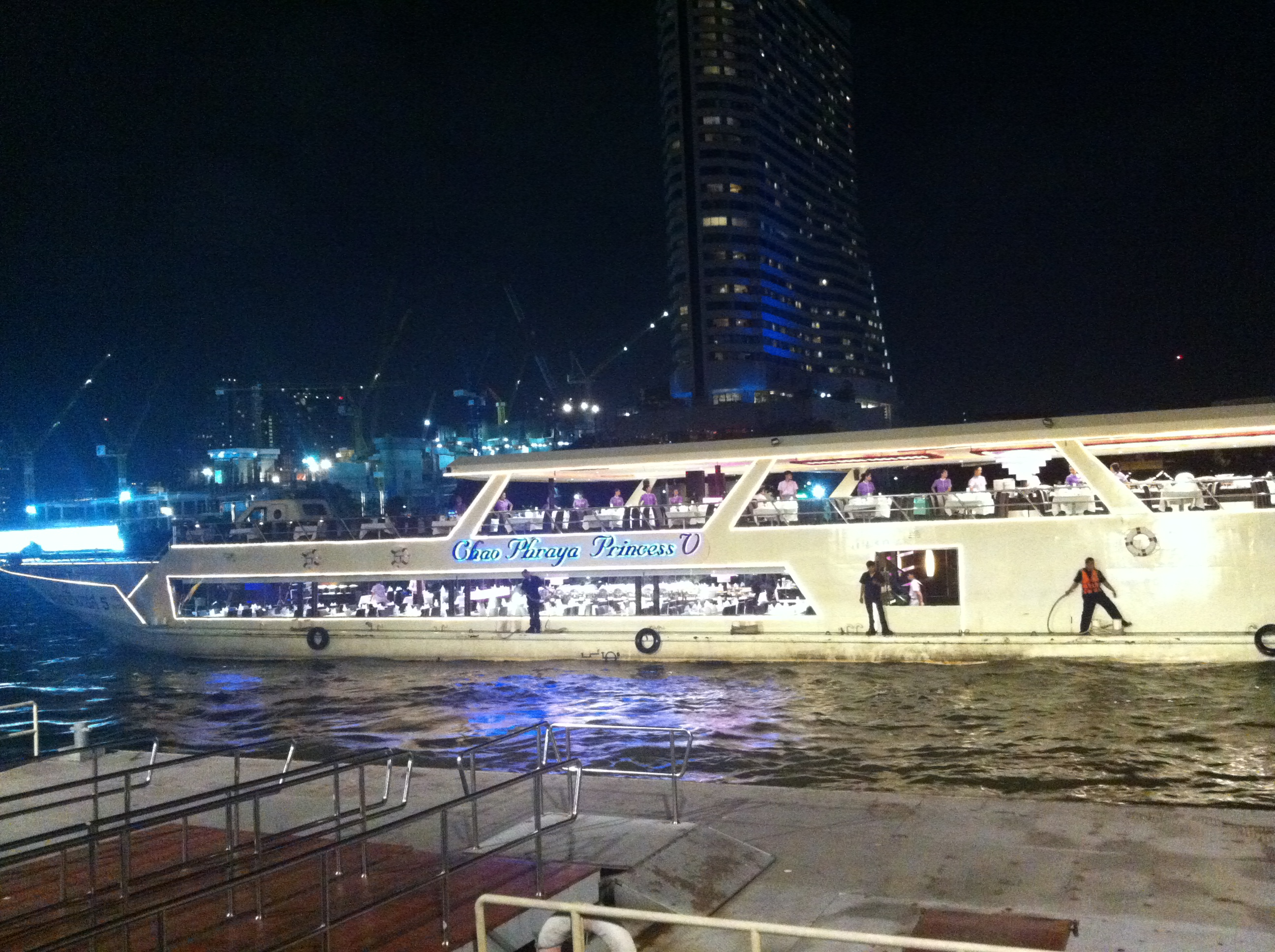
One of the cruises ready for cruise dinner, a popular tourism activity in Bangkok

Dinner cruises in the evening travel along the Chao Phraya River, giving tourists an opportunity to view lit-up landmarks along the river banks of Bangkok.

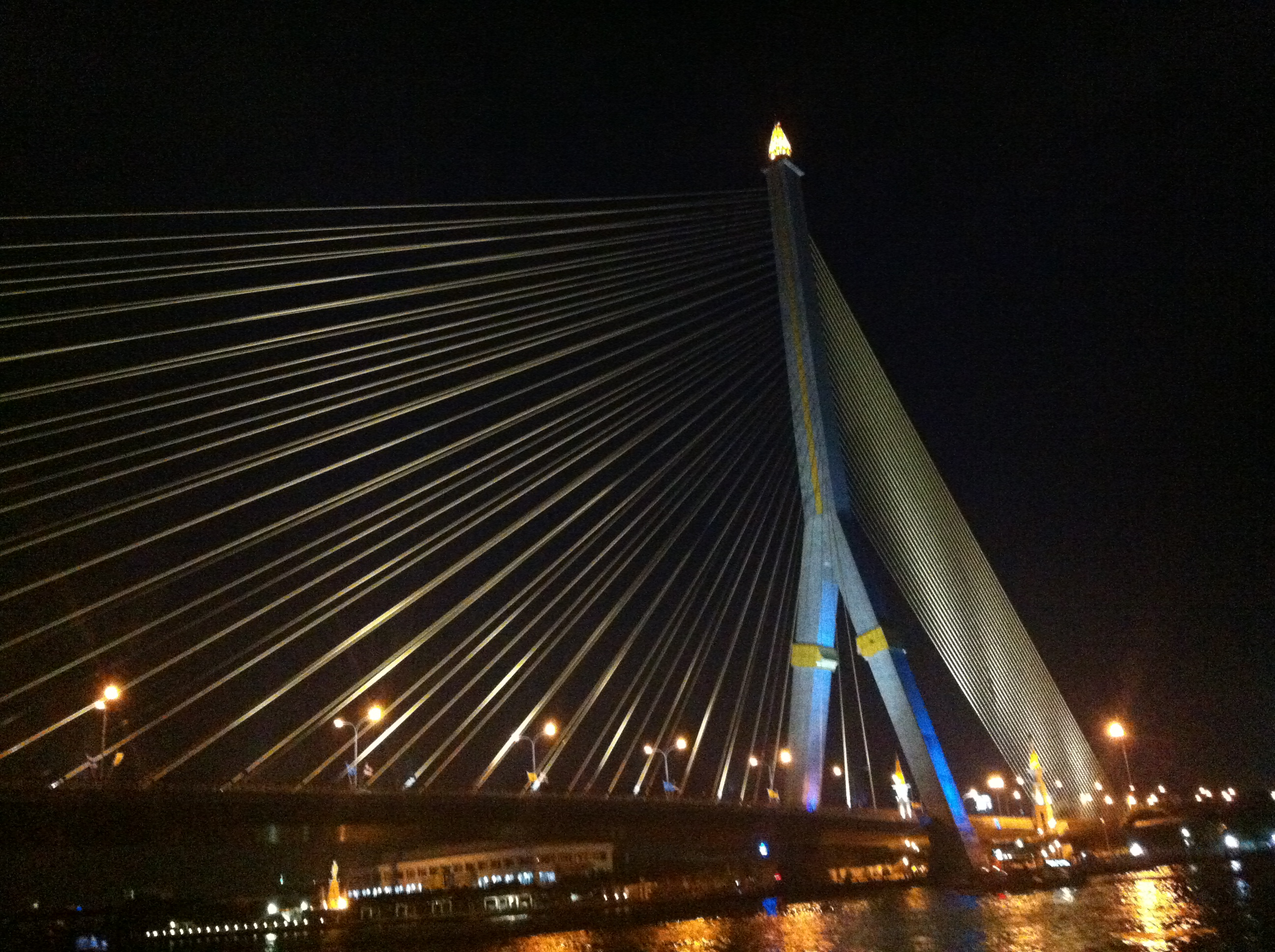
View from Cruise dinner in Bangkok

== Cultural performances ==
Jim Thompson Museum (พิพิธภัณฑ์จิม ทอมป์สัน) was constructed by American expatriate Jim Thompson from several traditional Thai-style houses, dismantled and assembled into one dwelling. Thompson helped restore and promote the Thai homemade silk industry after World War II. Following his mysterious disappearance in Malaysia in 1967, his home was turned into a museum to display his priceless collection of Asian art.

M.R. Kukrit's House (บ้านซอยสวนพลู), Thai traditional wooden house of M.R. Kukrit Pramoj, former Prime Minister of Thailand located on Soi Suan Phlu (Sathon 3 Alley). Here, it maintains many heritage of Thai wisdom.

Khlong Bang Luang Artist House (บ้านศิลปิน), antique wooden house over 200 years old by the Khlong Bangkok Yai is a showcase of many art works and also a Thai puppet show.

Lhong 1919 (ล้ง 1919), port and warehouse aged over 160 years on the Chao Phraya River, built in ancient Chinese architecture, at present, it has been restored to be a learning center about Thai-Chinese relations including a center for displaying and selling products of young designers.

ChangChui (ช่างชุ่ย), locates in the old district of Thonburi is new shopping area at the side of Thonburi. It was an idea of Mr Lim Somchai, the founder of Flynow, who wanted to transform an empty land into a land of "unlimited creativity that give opportunities to the new generations to use their creativity, passion, inspiration, knowledge and art in making their careers". There are many food stalls, restaurants, cafés and street foods and the highlight here is a huge plane that parks in the middle of the hall. There is a restaurant called Nao, which is taken from Noah's Ark, who would take the animals into the boat to escape the world's floods according to faith in the book of Genesis of Christianity. Its name can be roughly translated as "Heedlessly Artisan" or "Very Heedlessly".

=== Theatres ===
The National Theatre (โรงละครแห่งชาติ), the national theatre of Thailand located near foot of Phra Pinklao Bridge beside to Sanam Luang, is the main venue for the "Khon", a National Dance Performances.

Chaloem Krung Royal Theatre (เฉลิมกรุงรอยัลเธียเตอร์) is on Charoen Krung Road (New Road) in Wang Burapha area near the Old Siam Plaza. Thai dramas and plays are staged, while Khon, are occasionally performed here.

The Traditional Thai Puppet Theatre (นาฏยศาลา หุ่นละครเล็ก) hosts the Hun Lakhon Lek puppet show. It was inspired by Master Sakhon Yangkhieosot (also known as Joe Louis), named a National Artist in 1996. Hun Lakhon Lek usually performs episodes of the "Ramakian", the Thai version of the Ramayana epic. Sakhon Nattasin is currently the only performing troupe of Hun Lakhon Lek in Thailand, and in 2000 received a Thailand Tourism Award in Recreational Attraction from the Tourism Authority of Thailand (TAT).

Patravadi Theatre (ภัทราวดีเธียเตอร์) Renowned for its lavish productions, this outdoor theatre has gained popularity through its modern adaptations of classical Asian literature, with each play demonstrating a blend of various theatrical techniques.

Siam Niramit (สยามนิรมิต) has state-of-the-art cultural performances which have achieved international standards. Located in the centre of Bangkok, it opens everyday, presenting one of the world's largest stage productions. It uses special techniques integrated with drama to depict the history of each region of Thailand including depictions of hell, the forest of Himmaphan, heavens, and lands beyond imagination from Thai literature. There is also a performance of Thailand's arts and cultural heritage. The show is staged by more than 150 performers with as many as 500 costumes in a luxurious theatre with a capacity of more than 2,000 seats.

Thailand Cultural Centre (ศูนย์วัฒนธรรมแห่งประเทศไทย) is a performing arts venue in Huai Khwang District.

== Hotels ==
A number of luxury hotel chains can be found in Bangkok, such as the Peninsula Bangkok, which in 2006 made the top 10 in Travel and Leisure magazine's top 100 hotels list, coming in at number 4, while the Oriental Hotel claimed the ninth spot. Sukhumvit Road hosts a series of international chains such as JW Marriott, The Landmark, InterContinental, Sheraton, and many boutique hotels such as Tenface Bangkok, The Davis, Unico Grande Sukhumvit. The Banyan Tree on Sathon, one of Bangkok's tallest hotels, featured the highest bar and restaurant in the city, Vertigo, until the launch of Sirocco Restaurant on top of State Tower, 247 m (810 ft) up from the streets of Bang Rak.

Bangkok offers a number of smaller boutique hotels for travelers seeking uniquely designed lodgings and personalized service. There are large numbers of inexpensive hotels scattered throughout the city such as Yaowarat Road, most notably in the backpackers' paradise of Khaosan Road. Motels are uncommon in Bangkok. Bed and breakfasts (B&Bs) adapted to the Asian lifestyle are a fast-growing segment. A variety of these small houses can be found in Phloen Chit, Watthana, and Khlong Toei.

In the event that the Thai government legalizes gambling, Bangkok is expected to be one of the locations of an integrated resort.

== Shopping ==
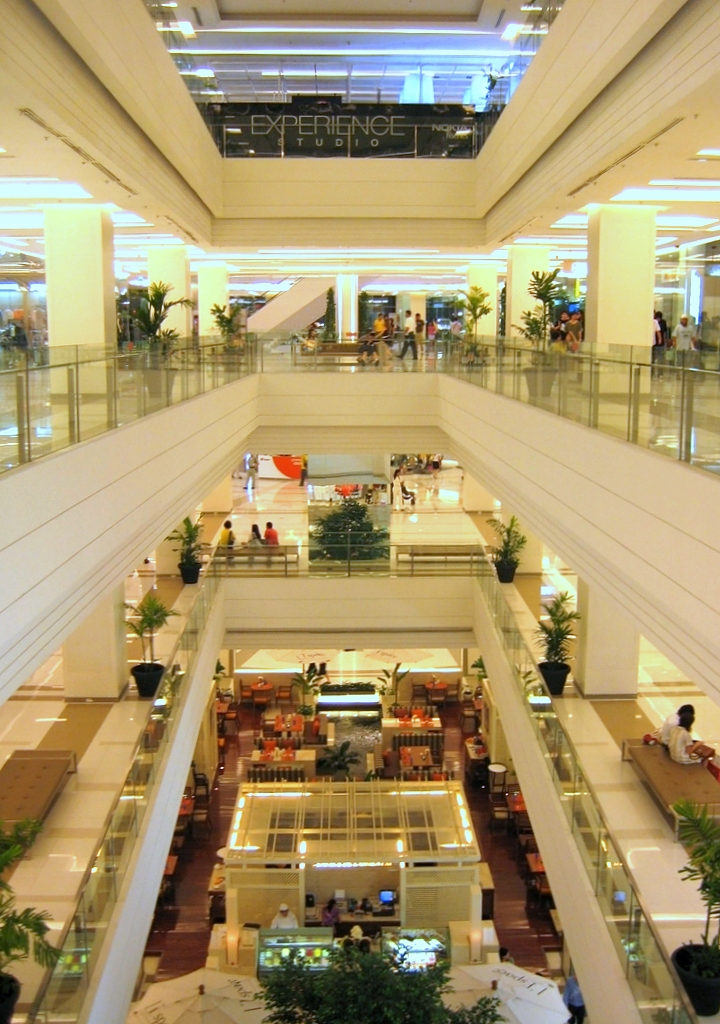
Siam Paragon, one of the biggest shopping malls in Asia

Thailand has a variety of shopping experiences, from street markets to world class luxury malls. Tourists have historically always preferred markets and bazaars to the other forms of shopping. The Chatuchak weekend market is one of the largest shopping destinations in Bangkok. Water markets are gradually disappearing, but remain strong tourist attractions as many tours are offered through the canals the markets are located on.

Bangkok includes over 15 world class malls situated around Bangkok, many centered around Sukhumvit Road and Ploenchit-Ratchaprasong. There are approximately 25 shopping malls, 35 lifestyle shopping centers, 40 department stores, 55 superstores, and 1,100 convenience stores around Bangkok.

Shopping in Bangkok is not limited to one or two major streets. There are many areas throughout Bangkok affording ample choices and easy access. The following is a selection of some of the principal shopping areas.

Phloen Chit-Ratchaprasong (เพลินจิต-ราชประสงค์): Top department stores and luxury shopping malls are concentrated in the area, namely Gaysorn Plaza, Isetan, Erawan Bangkok, Peninsula Plaza, all of which together make the largest shopping promenade in Bangkok. Furthermore, Central World Plaza and Narayana Phand Pavilion, host the official handicraft centre selling items from all parts of the country. Ratchaprasong intersection is the gateway to several shopping areas such as Phloen Chit-Sukhumvit, Siam Square-Mahboonkrong, Silom and Pratunam-Phetchaburi.

Silom-Surawong-Patpong (สีลม-สุรวงศ์-พัฒพงษ์): Silom Road is the main artery of Bangkok's commercial heart and is paralleled by Surawong Road, while Patpong runs crosswise between the two. In addition to housing dozens of specialist shops and boutiques representing all the major buys, this area also boasts many branches of well-known retailers and several shopping plazas. Street stalls also abound, most notably at Patpong's famous night market.

Pratunam-Phetchaburi (ประตูน้ำ-เพชรบุรี): A highlight in the district is Pratunam market, one of Bangkok's biggest centres for ready-to-wear clothing.

MBK Center (มาบุญครอง): A shopping center and Siam Square (สยามสแควร์) area are targeted towards bargain shoppers.

== Local life ==
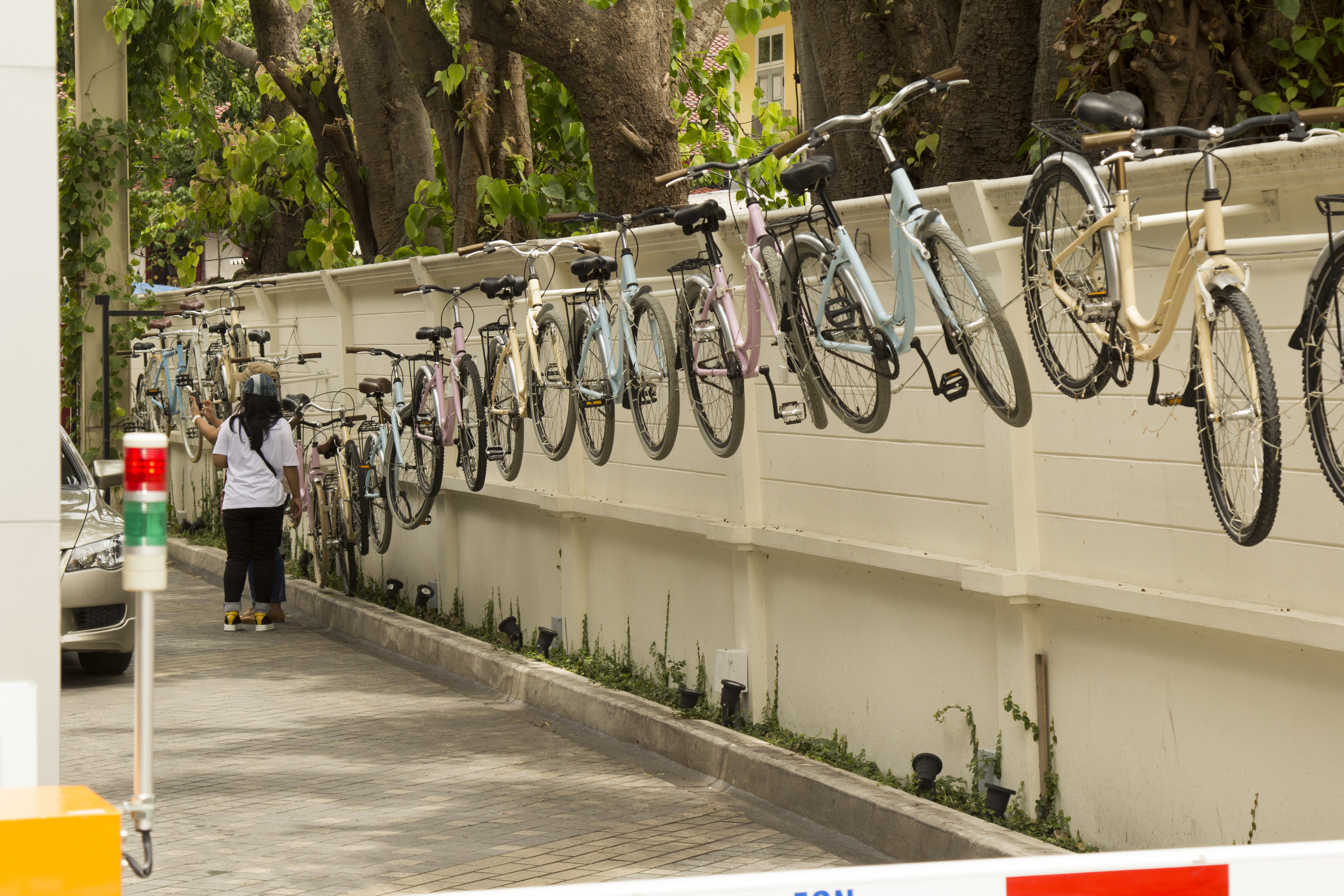
Large number of bicycles hangs at one wall of Charoen Krung area for chic; it is considered part of Charoen Krung Creative District.

Socially interacting with the Bangkokian native people is possible by walking around the cultural neighbourhood. These are some local and cultural neighbourhoods that offer many different things

- Kudi Chin neighbourhood (ชุมชนกุฎีจีน) is a neighbourhood consists of four main cultural groups; Thai Buddhists, Catholics, Chinese and Muslims. The neighbourhood preserves its iconic architecture and people's living. A dish here is the Kanom Farang.
- Talat Noi neighbourhood (ย่านตลาดน้อย) a historic neighbourhood of Thai Chinese descent by the Chao Phraya River, not far from Yaowarat.
- Charoen Krung Creative District was the first modern road of Thailand that now sits unsignificant. Led by Thailand Creative and Design Centre or TCDC, the project aims to create the awareness and bring people to touch the life and iconic architecture of this area.
- Charoen Chai neighbourhood (ชุมชนเจริญไชย) the community of Thai Chinese people who are flanked by Charoen Krung and Phlappha Chai Roads. They have been living here for a long time since the early Chinatown and still maintain ancient traditions and occupations to this day.
- Sam Phraeng Alleys neighbourhood (ย่านสามแพร่ง) a historic neighbourhood within Rattanakosin Island. It is divided into three alleys.
- Ban Krua Community (ชุมชนบ้านครัว) a last Thai silk Muslim community in Bangkok, not far from Jim Thompson Museum.
- Ban Bu Community (ชุมชนบ้านบุ) a last Thai handicraft community in making stone polished bronze bowl.
- Ban Bat Community (ชุมชนบ้านบาตร) a last Bangkokian community in making monk's alms bowl.
- Wat Champa Community (ชุมชนวัดจำปา) also known as Ko San Chao Community (ชุมชนเกาะศาลเจ้า) a community of planters in Taling Chan District, surrounded by orchards and ditches. Nowadays, they still maintain the traditional way of life as in the past, there is also homestay for visitors to experience the lifestyle here. Moreover, this community is also the last source that still maintains the banana engraving method, which is a traditional sculpting works used in various auspicious ceremonies.
- Hua Takhe Community (ชุมชนหัวตะเข้) a traditional community along the Khlong Prawet Burirom in east suburb Bangkok, the community contains many different shops, which are getting rare these day. More than 100 years old, it still retains the quaint charm of the old day. Visitors will be pleased with the traditional market and community atmosphere while enjoying agreat variety of tasty food.
- Maha Sawasdee Boat Trip during the boat trip to Maha Sawasdee, a interesting place to visit is the agricultural areas because the areas specialises in farming and most people there are in the agriculture industry. One can have fun with collecting lotus or visit the fruit garden to watch the orchard and mixed farming with seasonal fruits. Also, the rice fields are a popular site for visitors.
- Ban Lao Community (ชุมชนบ้านลาว) also known as Bang Sai Kai Community (ชุมชนบางไส้ไก่) a traditional community of Thai Lao people near Wongwian Yai, the last community in Bangkok that still maintains the production of bamboo flute.

== See also ==
- Tourism in Thailand
- Safari World
