= Khan long hin =

Khan long hin (Thai: ขันลงหิน, pronounced [kʰǎn lōŋ hǐn]), or stone-polished bronze bowls, are a type of traditional Thai handicraft. The Ban Bu neighbourhood in Bangkok is the last place in the world that makes khan long hin. These bronze bowls were historically used to hold lustral water in religious ceremonies, and were a luxury item used only by aristocrats. Handmade through a laborious process, today they are valued by collectors, and are regarded as a 5-star OTOP (One Tambon One Product) item.

Story of Khan long hin was started since in Ayutthaya era, when Autthaya was the old capital city of Thailand. After capital change from Ayutthaya to Rattanakosin, Khan long hin was moved to Rattanakosin too. At that time, there are many houses in Baan Bu community make Khan long hin. But today, there is only one house in village that makes Khan long hin.

== Process ==
There are 6 processes to make Khan long hin

1. Melting process: melt copper, tin and scrap bronze by high temperature and pour in to crucible.
2. Smash processes: while it still hot and do this process again until get shapes that expect.
3. Stripping process: In this process will get bronze dish that have black color. This color is real color of Khan long hin.
4. Turning operation process: this is doing for decorate the dish.
5. Spinning process: do to make smooth the dish.
6. Polishing process: for decorate and carve. In this process must use craft man that have high skill and more experience to do it.
