= Wat Suwannaram =

Buddhist temple in Bangkok, Thailand

Coordinates: 13°45′47.9″N 100°28′36.6″E

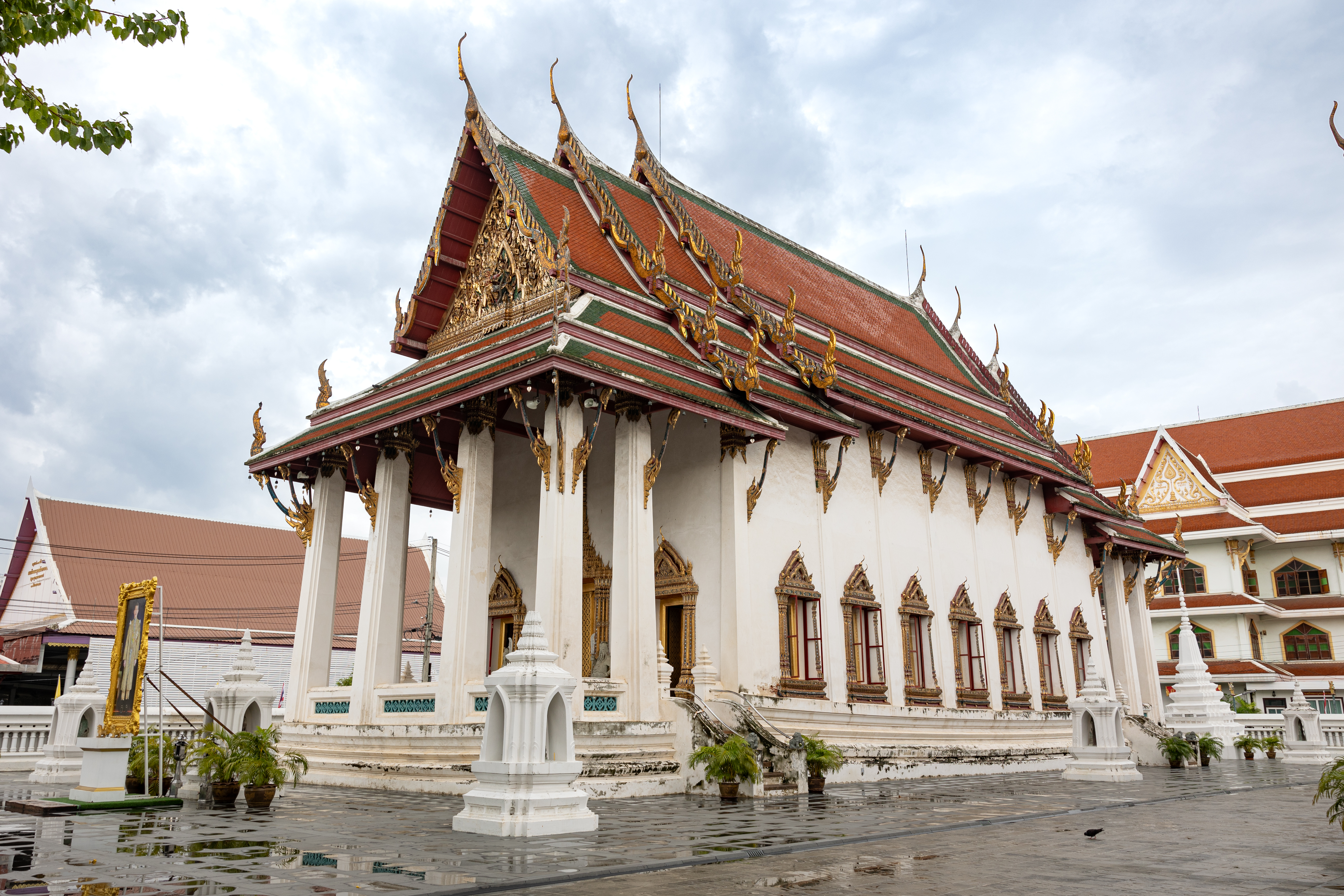
Ordination hall of the temple.

Wat Suwannaram Ratchaworawihan (Thai: วัดสุวรรณาราม ราชวรวิหาร) or usually shortened to Wat Suwannaram and Wat Suwan (วัดสุวรรณาราม, วัดสุวรรณ; RTGS: Wat Suwan Naram, Wat Suwan) is a historic second-class royal temple in Bangkok located in Soi Charan Sanit Wong 32, Charan Sanit Wong Road, Siri Rat Subdistrict, Bangkok Noi District, Thonburi side, on the western bank of Khlong Bangkok Noi.

== History ==
The temple dates back to the Ayutthaya period, when it was known as "Wat Thong" (วัดทอง, lit. 'golden monastery') without apparent evidence of the builder. Later on, in the era of King Taksin of Thonburi Kingdom, it was used as the execution ground for Burmese prisoners of war similar to Wat Khok (now Wat Phlapphla Chai) in today's Phlapphla Chai area. King Phutthayotfa Chulalok (Rama I) bestowed the name Wat Suwannaram, indicating royal patronage. Until the reign of King Chulalongkorn (Rama V) the grounds of Wat Suwannaram were also used as the Royal Cremation site for members of the Royal Family and top ranking officials of the Kingdom.

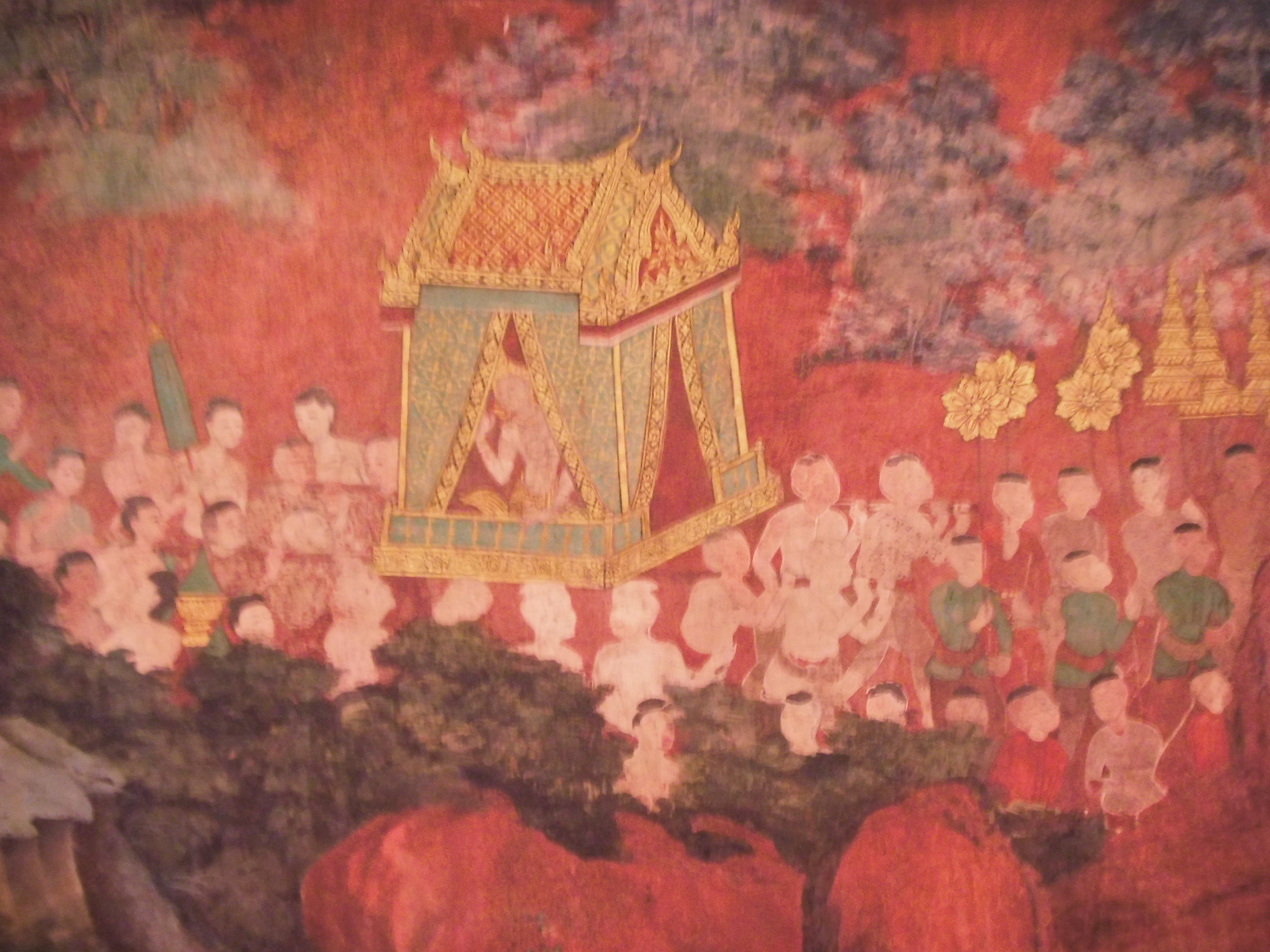
One of murals within ordination hall.

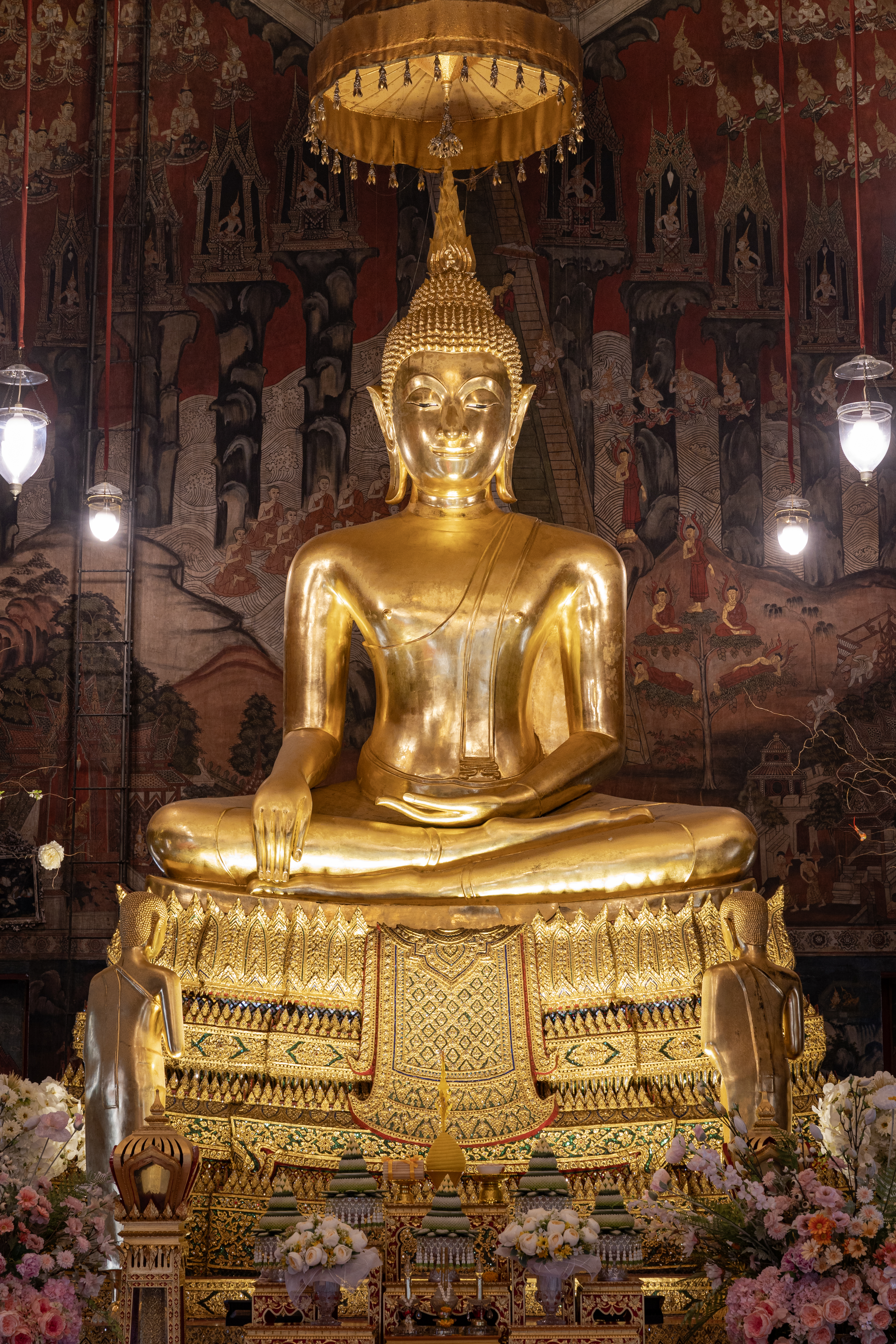
Phra Satsada.

King Nangklao (Rama III), restored the temple and sponsored the painting of murals in the ordination hall by two famous artists named Luang Wichijesda or Kru Thong Yu and Chinese Luang Seniborirak or Kru Kong Pae. They competed with each other during the painting using a veil so their unfinished artwork could not be seen. The murals are painted in traditional Thai-style depicting stories of Prince Nemi and Prince Mahosadha from the Mahanipata Jataka. The murals of this temple are considered masterpiece paintings of the Rattanakosin era with 80 percent preserved. The architecture of the ordination hall is also of interest, the building being curved like a Chinese junk in the style of late Ayutthaya period.

Around Wat Suwannaram there are still traditional communities with a long history such as Ban Bu, the last community of bronzework handicraft makers in Bangkok, Wat Thong Market, the local flea market for more than 100 years, an old traditional Thai medicine pharmacy, Bangkok Noi Museum, Wat Suwannaram School, and nearby the historic railway station Bangkok Noi Railway Station.

== Principal Buddha image ==
The temple's principal Buddha image known as "Phra Satsada" (พระศาสดา; "prophet Buddha") is regarded as highly sacred. Many people come daily to make vows. As part of the ritual they bring a loincloth to tie around their waist and run three times around the ordination hall while making sounds resembling a horse. This practice is called "running the horse".

== Ghost stories ==
Because the temple used to be an execution ground, it is rumored to be haunted. When the area was being renovated to build the school playground at Wat Suwannaram, many human skeletons were uncovered. To honour and control the spirits of the Burmese soldiers, a spirit house was built specifically for the Thai soldier's spirits. This spirit house still stands today on the school playground. The spirit house is dedicated to the Thai soldier's spirits, not the Burmese soldiers. Some people claim to have seen a preta on the bell tower, as well as a male headless ghost wearing red chong kraben. One of the security guards also says he saw a woman's ghost near the pier around 2:00 am.
