= Royal Elephant National Museum =

Museum in Bangkok, Thailand

Coordinates: 13.773754°N 100.514447°E

The Royal Elephant National Museum, also known as Chang Ton National Museum, is a museum located in Dusit District, Bangkok, Thailand. Permanent closed

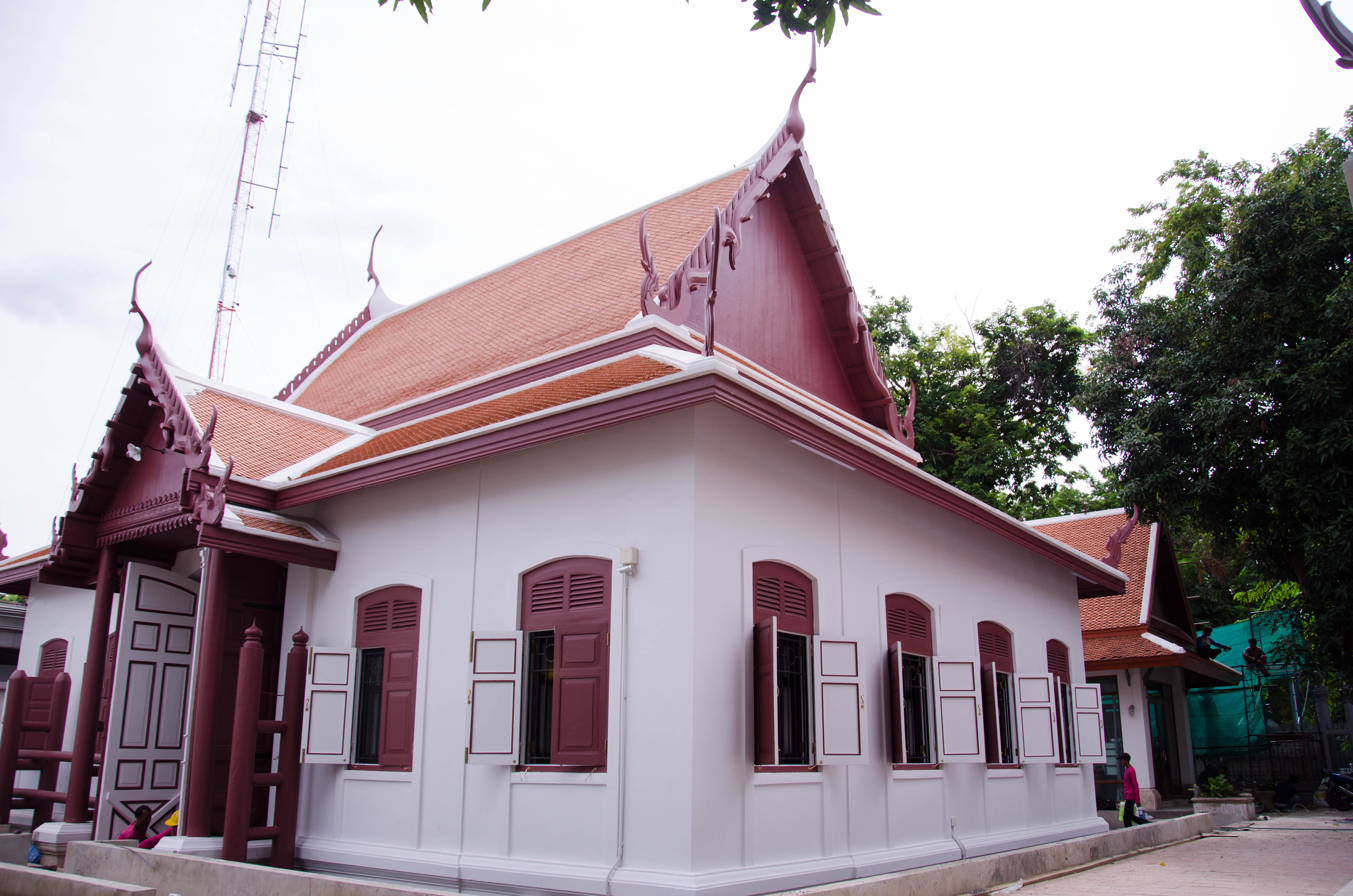
Royal Elephant National Museum
