= Thai Labour Museum =

Museum in Bangkok, Thailand

Coordinates: 13.753144°N 100.549382°E

Thai Labour Museum is a museum in Ratchathewi District, Bangkok, Thailand. The museum is currently closed for renovations. It is scheduled to reopen on June 24, 2025.
