= King Rama VI Museum =

Museum in Bangkok, Thailand

Coordinates: 13.746555°N 100.495141°E

King Rama VI Museum is a military history museum in Phra Nakhon District, Bangkok, Thailand, located within the Territorial Defense Command. The museum is dedicated to King Vajiravudh.
