= Bamrung Chat Satsana Ya Thai =

Traditional medicine store in Bangkok, Thailand

Coordinates: 13°45′05″N 100°30′00″E

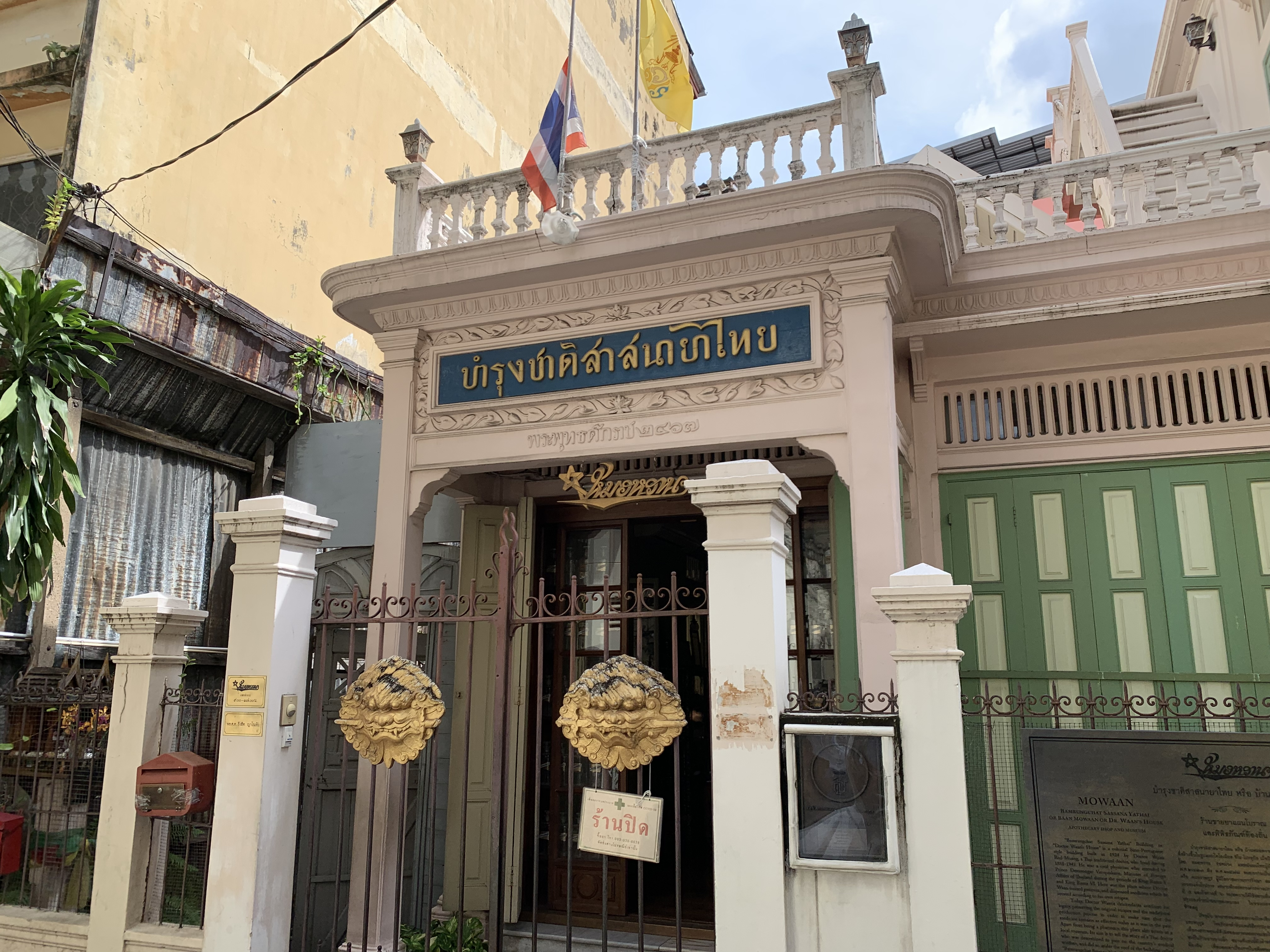
Front facade of Bamrungchat Satsana Yathai or Baan Mowaan.

Bamrungchat Satsana Yathai (Thai: บำรุงชาติสาสนายาไทย) or familiarly known as Ban Mowaan (บ้านหมอหวาน) is a traditional Thai medicine store and historic building located at 9, Soi Thesa, Bamrung Mueang Road, Wat Ratchabophit Subdistrict, Phra Nakhon District, Bangkok.

It was created by Wan Rodmuang (นายหวาน รอดม่วง) or Mo Waan (หมอหวาน; lit: Doctor Waan) under the traditional Thai medicine who lived in the reigns of King Chulalongkorn (Rama V) to Ananda Mahidol (Rama VIII) (1870–1945). In the past, Mo Waan lived at the intersection of Unakan Road and Charoen Krung Road (Unakan Intersection in the present) and later moved near to the Sao Chingcha (Giant Swing) on the current location. It's a colonial-style old building, which is a house as well as a traditional Thai medicine shop that has been inherited for more than four generations. The building is still filled with antiquities that tell the story of the past as well as the ancient medicine over a hundred years. It has been very popular in the past and the medicine production process is still being relayed in a traditional way by the old equipments with the age of hundred over years. At present, it's open to visitors who are interested in visiting as a museum for tourism and selling traditional Thai medicine as well.

The building received the ASA Architectural Conservation Award in 2014.

== See more ==
- traditional Thai medicine
