= Gem and Jewelry Museum =

Museum in Thailand

Coordinates: 13.726959°N 100.529341°E

Gem and Jewelry Museum is a museum in Bangkok, Thailand operated by the Gem and Jewelry Institute of Thailand Public Organization, Faculty of Science, Chulalongkorn University.

The displays include gems and mineral specimens, mining, the origins of gems and how they are cut and graded, precious metals and manufacturing procedures of gold, platinum and silver jewelries.
