= Samphanthawong Museum =

Museum in Bangkok, Thailand

Coordinates: 13.73692°N 100.510971°E

Samphanthawong Museum, also known as the Bangkok Local Museum, Samphanthawong, is a museum in Samphanthawong District, Bangkok, Thailand. The museum focuses on the history of early Chinese immigrants in the Samphanthawong district. Exhibits are presented in both Thai and English, with accompanying visuals.
