= Rare Stone Museum =

Museum of stones, minerals, fossils in Thailand

Coordinates: 14.0053°N 100.5640°E

Rare Stone Museum (Thai: พิพิธภัณฑ์หินแปลก) is a museum at 29/2 Moo 1 Rangsit, Pathum Thani Road in Pathum Thani Province, north of Bangkok. It was previously at 1048–1054 Thanon Charoen Krun in Bang Rak District in Bangkok before it moved in 2008. The museum is privately owned by former businessman Khun Yanyong Lertnimit, a tailor of garments, and includes an extensive collection of items he has collected over the decades. The name of the museum "rare" refers to the shape of the stones rather than the type.

== Collection ==
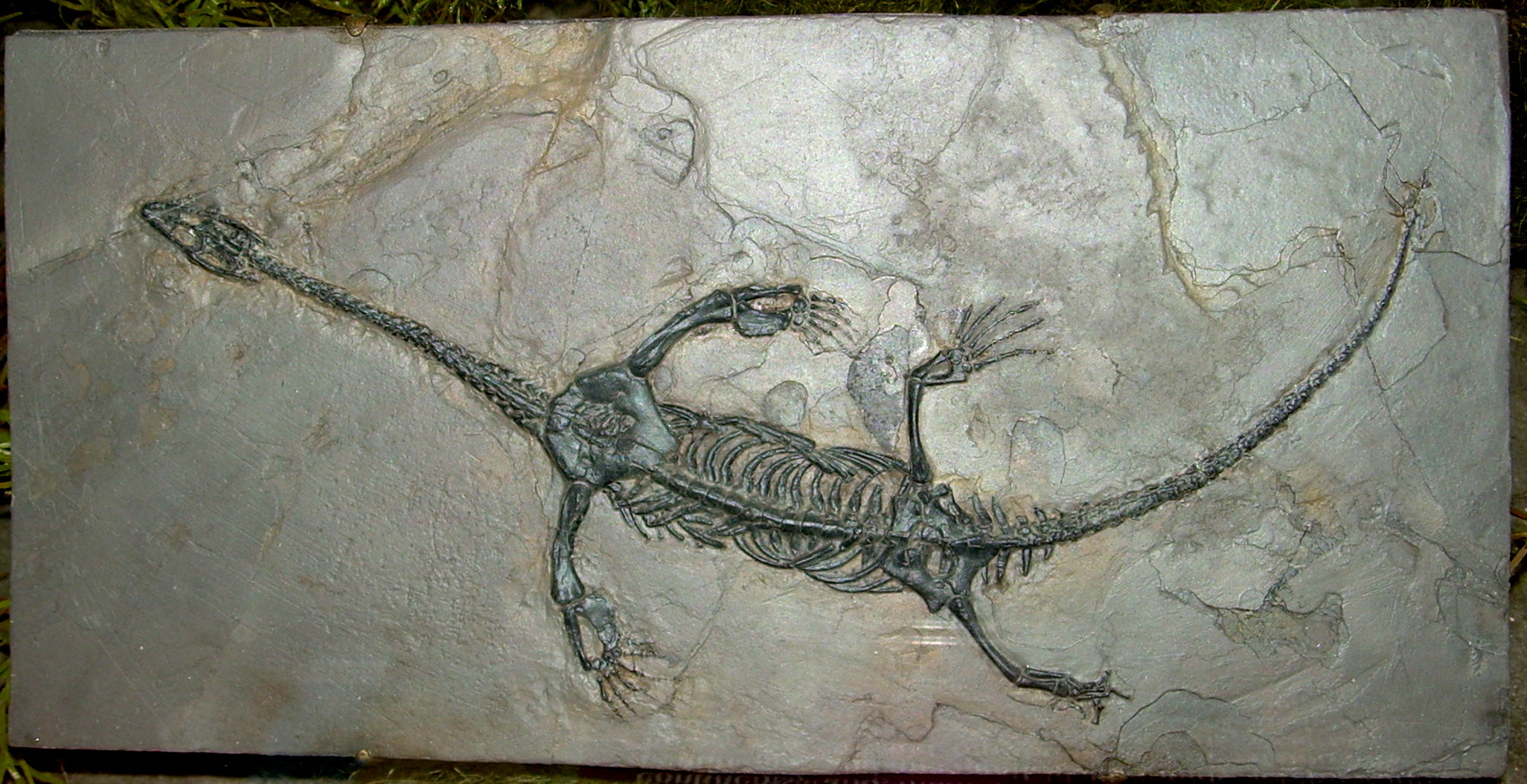
Keichousaurus

The museum has a collection of rare or unusual stones and fossils of varying colours and shapes. There are approximately 2000 stones in the Rare Stone Museum, selected from Lertnimit's more extensive personal collection. Of particular note are stones which "look like two penguins loving each other", a "deep-sea stone from Taiwanese waters attached to which are filaments of dry white seaweed", and "a stone that looks like it is implanted with rice grains". There is also the skull of a crocodile, a turtle, fish, shells, and fossils from the Keichousaurus, an aquatic reptile which lived in China 248 million years ago.

There are numerous stamps, photos, ashtrays, cigarette boxes, matches and paintings on display. There are also selections of Chinese poetry and literature, that Lertnimit has collected over the years.
