= Suan Dusit Art Gallery =

Art gallery in Bangkok, Thailand

The Suan Dusit Art Gallery is operated by Suan Dusit University. It is on the university's Dusit District, Bangkok, Thailand campus.
