= Bangkok Doll Museum =

Museum in Bangkok, Thailand

Coordinates: 13.75940°N 100.54676°E

- Established: 1957
- Location: Ratchathewi District, Bangkok, Thailand
- Type: Toy museum
- Founder: Khunying Thongkorn Chanthawimol

Bangkok Doll Museum is a museum in Ratchathewi District, Bangkok, Thailand.

The Bangkok Dolls Museum was established in 1957 by Khunying Thongkorn Chanthawimol, who was a renowned doll maker who trained in the Ozawa Doll School, in Tokyo, Japan. The museum has a collection of more than 400 Thai handmade dolls and the museum is recognised internationally, being the recipient of the first prize at the International Folklore Dolls Competition in Kraków, Poland in 1978.

Although the museum displays thematic aspects of rural life in Thailand, the hill tribes of northern Thailand, and traditional costumes from Thailand, there is a section covering traditional costumes from all over the world include Central European countries such as Poland, Russia, Hungary and Greece.

One of the main highlights of the museum is the doll collection of characters in the Khon dance drama based on the Ramakien which depict the forces of good and the forces of evil. Miniature Khon masks are also on display.
