= Museum of Counterfeit Goods =

Museum in Bangkok, Thailand

Coordinates: 13.682809°N 100.547293°E

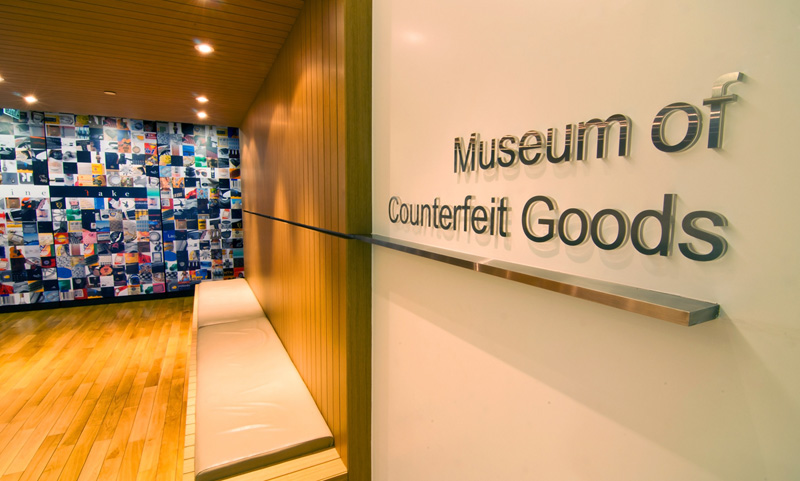
- In 2011
- Location: Yan Nawa District, Bangkok, Thailand
- Owner: Tilleke & Gibbins

The Tilleke & Gibbins Museum of Counterfeit Goods is a museum focused on intellectual property infringement in Yan Nawa District, Bangkok, Thailand. It is operated by Tilleke & Gibbins, a law firm with offices in Thailand and Vietnam. In the firm's Bangkok office on the 26th floor of Supalai Grand Tower, the museum is home to a variety of counterfeit and infringed goods that the firm has accumulated in its work.

The museum receives over a thousand visitors each year. Local and international newspapers and magazines such as the Christian Science Monitor and Time magazine have published articles on the Tilleke & Gibbins museum.

== Purpose ==
Bangkok has a reputation as one of the world’s premiere marketplaces for counterfeit goods. Consumers sometimes mistakenly view illegal trade in counterfeit products as a "victimless crime".

Tilleke & Gibbins founded the museum and raise awareness regarding counterfeiting and other intellectual property issues. The Tilleke & Gibbins Museum of Counterfeit Goods is described as "one of the firm's key corporate social responsibility programs".

The museum shows the issues Thailand faces when tackling forgery, and teaches visitors to spot fake products by showing counterfeit goods alongside their genuine counterparts.

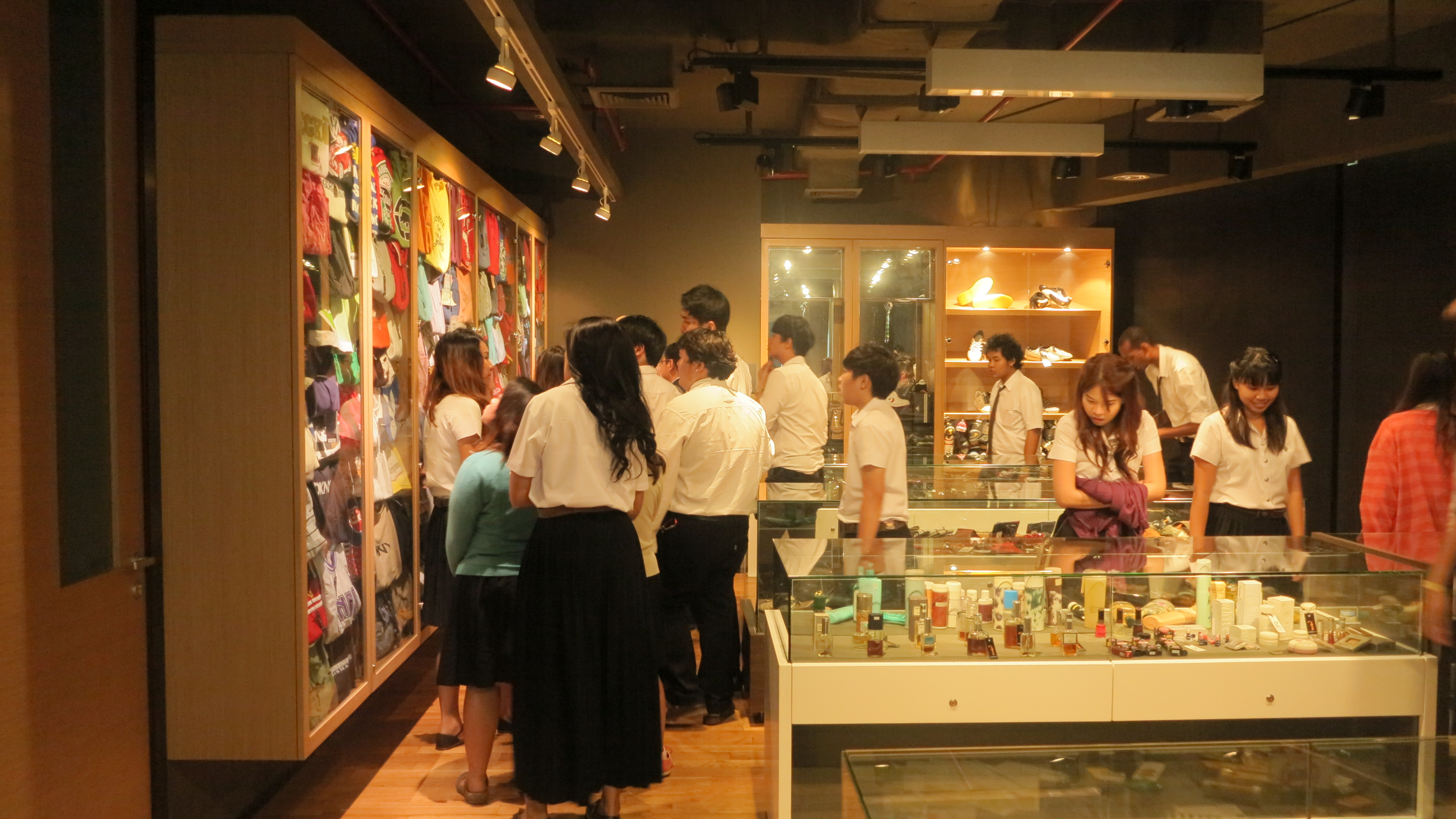
Students visit Museum of Counterfeit Goods

== Collection ==
The museum displays more than 4,000 goods that infringe trademarks, patents, and copyrights. One of the largest of its kind in the world, the museum is home to a collection of 14 broad categories of goods, including clothing, footwear, watches and eyewear, accessories, cosmetics and perfumes, food and household products, drugs, alcohol and cigarettes, copyright works, stationery and office supplies, automotive parts, tools, electrical devices, and miscellaneous products. According to CNN, the museum has "an eye-opening display that shows just how much is counterfeited, how far crooks will go to manufacture fake products, and the very real dangers that the industry creates."

Other unexpected counterfeited goods are shown, such as automotive accessories, bearings, residual-current devices, pencils, glue, and food products.

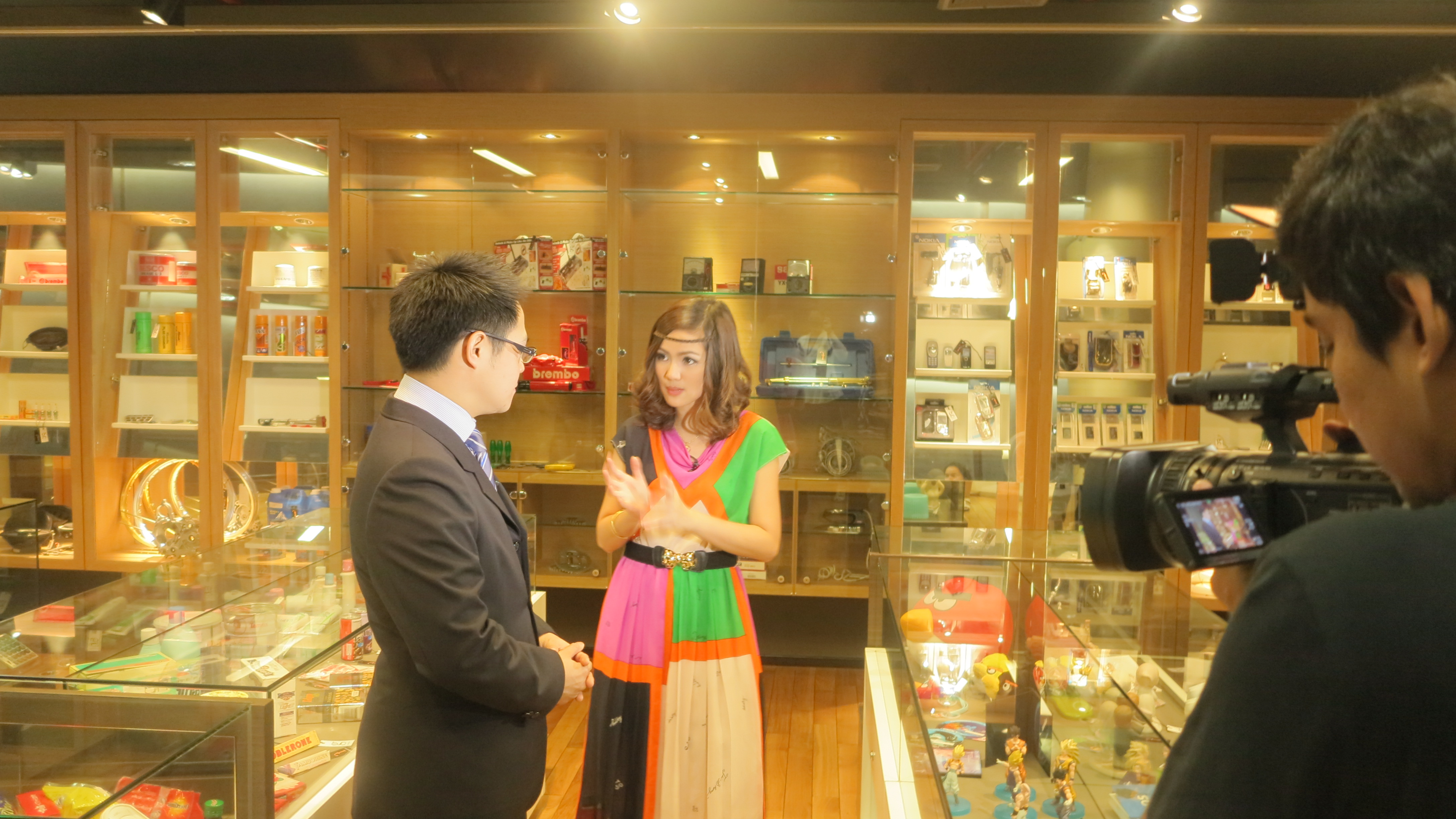
Media visits Museum of Counterfeit Goods
