= Baan Kao Lao Rueng Museum =

Coordinates: 13°44′33″N 100°30′36″E

- บ้านเก่าเล่าเรื่อง
- Established: 2011
- Location: 32 Soi Charoen Krung 23, Bangkok, Thailand
- Type: History museum

The Baan Kao Lao Rueng Museum (Thai: บ้านเก่าเล่าเรื่อง, RTGS: Ban Kao Lao Rueang) or Charoen Chai Community Museum is a history museum in Bangkok, Thailand focused on the Charoen Chai community, a Thai-Chinese joss paper making center. The museum is located in a renovated two-story shophouse, and was founded by the Charoen Chai Conservation and Rehabilitation Group in 2011.

== History ==
The museum is located in Soi Charoen Krung 23, a narrow alleyway between Charoen Krung and Phlapphla Chai roads. The alleyway is adjacent to Wat Mangkon Kamalawat and the Wat Mangkon MRT station. The shophouse was previously occupied by Chinese opera performers.
