= Spun's Gallery =

Coordinates: 13.7112°N 100.6944°E

Spun's Gallery, formerly known as Span's Cultural Gallery, is a museum in Bangkok focusing on historical Thai costumes and fashions. It was established by Sapan Thianprasit (Thai: สปัน เธียรประสิทธิ์), a 1950s socialite with a personal interest in fashion. The museum was previously located near Soi 62, Phahonyothin Road in Sai Mai District, but has been moved to a new place inside Charter International School in Prawet District.
