= Bangkok Fashion Trend Center =

Museum in Bangkok, Thailand

Fashion Trend Center was a museum in Bangkok, Thailand, established in November 2005 and closed on 30 September 2006.

It covered a total area of 500 square metres located on the sixth floor of the offices at Central World Plaza and was run by the government.
