= Tadu Art Gallery =

Coordinates: 13.748015°N 100.602538°E

Tadu Art Gallery is a private semi-commercial art gallery in Bangkok, Thailand, with several group and solo shows of beginning or well known Thai and foreign artists. The gallery was previously located in Phra Khanong District but is now in a building owned by a Volkswagen dealership in Bang Kapi District.
