= Museum of Buddhist Art =

Museum in Bangkok, Thailand

Coordinates: 13.733319°N 100.627084°E

The Museum of Buddhist Art is a museum in Suan Luang District, Bangkok, Thailand.
