= National Gallery (Thailand) =

Art gallery in Bangkok, Thailand

- พิพิธภัณฑสถานแห่งชาติ หอศิลป
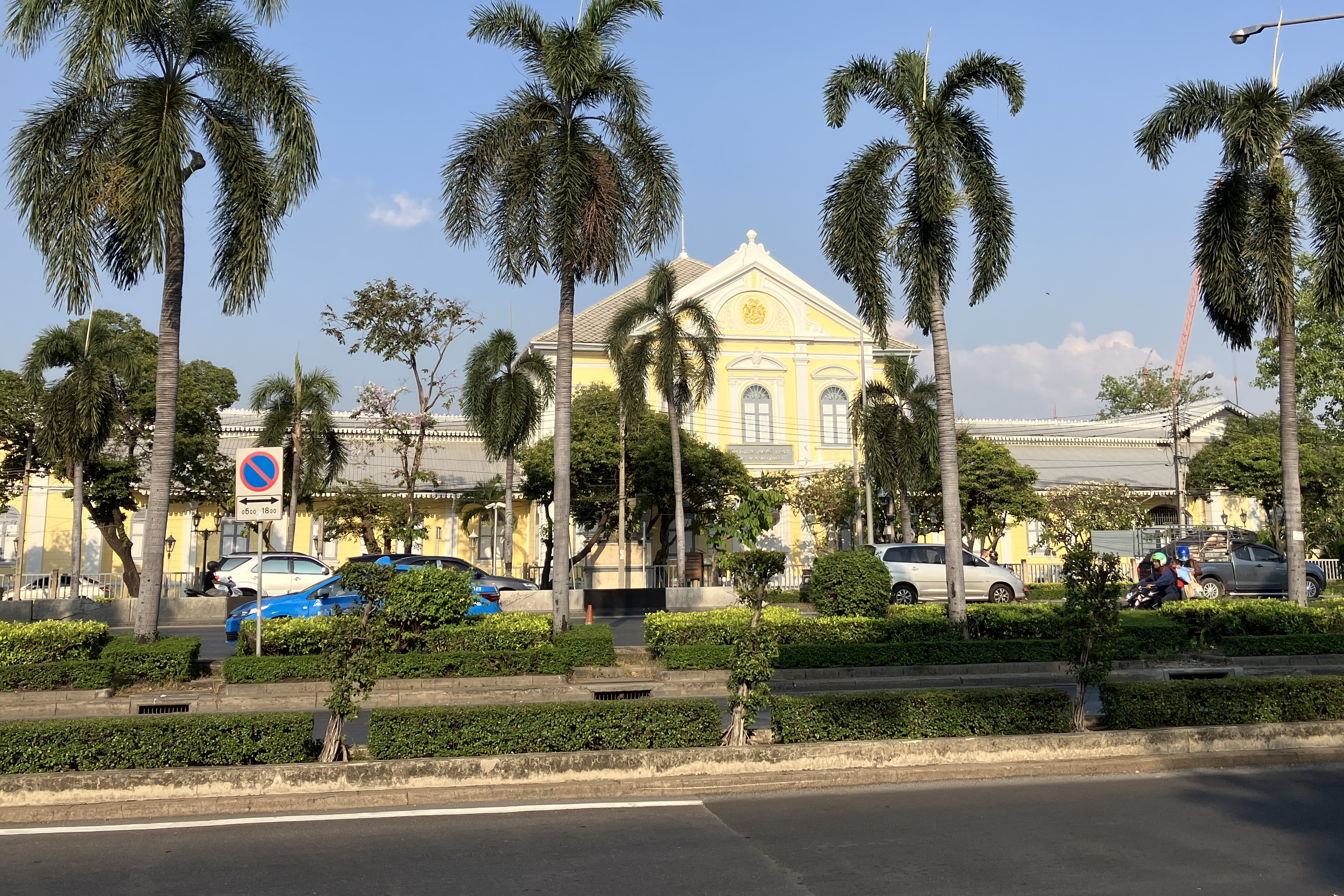
- Established: 8 August 1977
- Location: Phra Nakhon District
- Coordinates: 13°45′32″N 100°29′38″E
- Type: art gallery

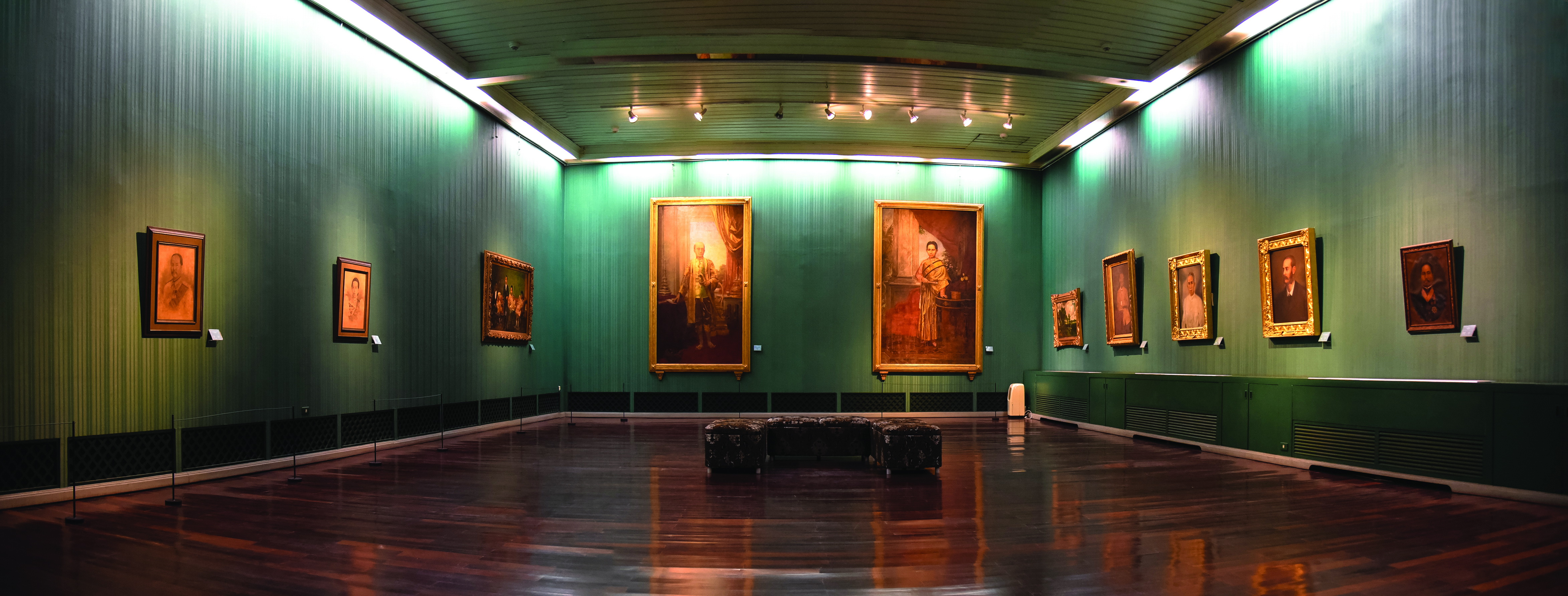
inside the National Gallery

The National Gallery (Thai: พิพิธภัณฑสถานแห่งชาติ หอศิลป) officially recognized as “The National Gallery (Hor Silp Chao Fa),” stands as the premier state-owned art museum and the primary guardian of the nation’s visual artistic treasures.Under the direct jurisdiction of the Fine Arts Department of the Ministry of Culture, the gallery acts as the central national repository for Thailand’s vast artistic heritage.Its collection's serves as a comprehensive visual record of the country’s aesthetic evolution, encompassing everything from traditional Thai masterpieces to modern and contemporary works.The museum is situated on Chao Fa Road in the historic heart of Bangkok’s Phra Nakhon district, housed within a registered national monument that was originally constructed to serve as the Royal Thai Mint.This unique architectural setting provides a bridge between Thailand’s industrial history and its cultural future, making the gallery one of the most significant landmarks in the kingdom’s artistic landscape.

== History ==
The historical lineage of the site where the National Gallery stands is a sophisticated chronicle of Thailand’s transition into the modern era, rooted deeply in the early Rattanakosin period. Long before its current function as a sanctuary for the visual arts, the area was occupied by various royal residences belonging to high-ranking princes, traditionally referred to as “Chao Fa,” during the reign of King Rama I.These structures were not merely homes but significant administrative and cultural nodes for the royal family, which explains why the adjacent thoroughfare eventually became known as Chao Fa Road.However, as the 20th century approached, the original buildings were demolished under the modernization policies of King Rama V, who sought to transform the area into a hub for state infrastructure and economic development to align Thailand with international standards.

On February 4, 1902, the site underwent a major functional shift with the inauguration of the Royal Thai Mint, known locally as Rong Kasap Sitthikan.This project was a definitive testament to Thailand’s industrial ambitions, featuring an architectural design by the renowned Italian engineer Carlo Allegri.Allegri skillfully blended European stylistic elements with the practical and rigorous needs of a heavy industrial facility.The mint utilized advanced automated machinery imported from Europe to produce national currency, operating continuously for over sixty years as the heart of Thailand’s monetary production until 1968.After the mint’s operations were relocated to a more modern facility, the building sat dormant for several years, preserved as a silent witness to the city’s industrial past before its eventual transition into a premier cultural landmark.

The transformation into its present form began on April 19, 1974, when a significant institutional handover occurred between the Treasury Department, the Ministry of Finance, and the Fine Arts Department.The mission was to adapt this industrial monument into a national gallery that could house the country’s growing and priceless collection of visual arts.Following a meticulous four-year restoration that balanced historical preservation with the stringent requirements of a modern museum, the “National Gallery” was officially opened on May 5, 1978.The institution’s footprint was further expanded on September 15, 1983, when additional land and buildings were granted by the state, providing the necessary space for the gallery to function as a major national institution for the preservation and promotion of both Thai and international visual arts.

== Aims ==
The National Gallery Bangkok operates with a sophisticated, multi-dimensional mandate that extends far beyond the traditional confines of a simple art repository. Its fundamental mission is to serve as the nation’s primary steward of visual culture, tasked with the systematic collection, meticulous cataloging, and scientific preservation of masterpieces that represent the zenith of Thai artistic heritage.By maintaining a collection that spans from the 17th century to the contemporary era, the institution provides a stable and secure environment for the conservation of delicate traditional works while simultaneously documenting the rapid stylistic shifts and socio-political reflections in modern Thai creativity.

Furthermore, the gallery acts as a vital socio-economic catalyst within the local art ecology. It provides a prestigious and accessible exhibition platform for Thai artists, offering them an opportunity to present their work to an international audience, thereby fostering a vibrant domestic art market and creative community.Beyond its preservation duties, the gallery is profoundly committed to public literacy and art education. Through an extensive program of workshops, curatorial guided tours, and scholarly seminars, the gallery strives to deepen public understanding of Thai cultural identity and the evolution of social aesthetics over time.In recent years, this aim has expanded to include digital modernization, integrating interactive museum collections to ensure that Thailand’s artistic heritage remains engaging, educational, and accessible to the digital generation.

== Finances ==
The financial governance of the National Gallery Bangkok is a model of state-managed cultural sustainability, prioritizing the preservation of heritage over commercial profitability.As a public cultural institution, its primary economic lifeblood is derived from the annual national budget allocated to the Fine Arts Department by the Thai government.This foundational funding is vital for the continuous maintenance of the historic building—a registered national monument—and the specialized scientific preservation required to protect delicate artworks from Thailand’s tropical climate.

Beyond basic operational costs, these financial resources are strategically managed to cover staff salaries, exhibition management, and the acquisition of significant new pieces for the national collection.In an effort to enhance its programming, the gallery also engages in special projects and collaborations with various cultural organizations, which often provide supplemental support for international touring exhibitions and research initiatives.Despite its reliance on state support, the gallery’s financial structure remains rooted in a non-profit ethos, ensuring that the preservation of Thai visual culture remains accessible to the public and is not compromised by the volatility of the commercial art market.All expenditures are subject to state audit, ensuring transparency in the management of national cultural assets.

== Architecture ==
The architectural significance of the National Gallery is rooted in its status as a definitive masterpiece of European-influenced industrial design, introduced during the pivotal modernization period of King Rama V.Designed by the esteemed Italian engineer Carlo Allegri, the structure reflects a period when Thailand began to integrate Western technological advancements with its own institutional requirements.The building is characterized by a high degree of structural integrity, featuring exceptionally thick load-bearing masonry walls and a grand, symmetrical floor plan that exudes a sense of permanence and authority.Signature arched windows and neo-classical decorative moldings further distinguish the facade, marking it as a prime example of the official government architecture of the early 20th century.

Originally constructed to house the Royal Thai Mint, the architectural design was inherently functional, prioritizing high security and the capacity to withstand the vibrations of heavy industrial coin-pressing machinery.The internal spaces were originally expansive workshops, which have since been meticulously adapted into sophisticated gallery halls suitable for museum-grade climate control and lighting systems.This successful transformation is recognized as a significant case study in “adaptive reuse” within the context of Thai architectural conservation.By maintaining the European-influenced exterior while updating the interior to meet international museum standards, the building serves as both a protector of art and a visible artifact of Thailand’s industrial and architectural modernization.

== Working Hours ==
For those planning a visit to experience Thailand’s artistic heritage, the National Gallery Bangkok maintains a consistent schedule designed to accommodate both local residents and international tourists.The gallery is officially open to the public from Wednesday to Sunday, with operating hours between 9:00 a.m. and 4:00 p.m..It is important for potential visitors to note that the institution is strictly closed on Mondays and Tuesdays, as well as on all official national public holidays.Admission fees are typically structured to be affordable, with specific rates for Thai nationals, students, and foreign visitors, reinforcing the gallery’s mission as an inclusive public institution.To ensure a seamless visit, checking the schedule in advance is highly recommended, as these hours are set to allow for the careful administrative and conservation work required to maintain the gallery’s national standards.

== Space ==
Permanent exhibition	930.5 m^{2} (10,016 sq ft)
Temporary exhibition	1,410 m^{2} (15,177 sq ft)
Auditorium	475 m^{2} (5,113 sq ft)
Recreation	500 m^{2} (5,382 sq ft)
Office	815 m^{2} (8,773 sq ft)
Total	4,130 m^{2} (44,455 sq ft)

== See also ==
- List of national galleries
