= Bangkok Folk Museum =

Museum in Bangkok, Thailand

Coordinates: 13°43′42″N 100°31′5″E

Bangkok Folk Museum, Bangkokian Museum
- พิพิธภัณฑ์ชาวบางกอก
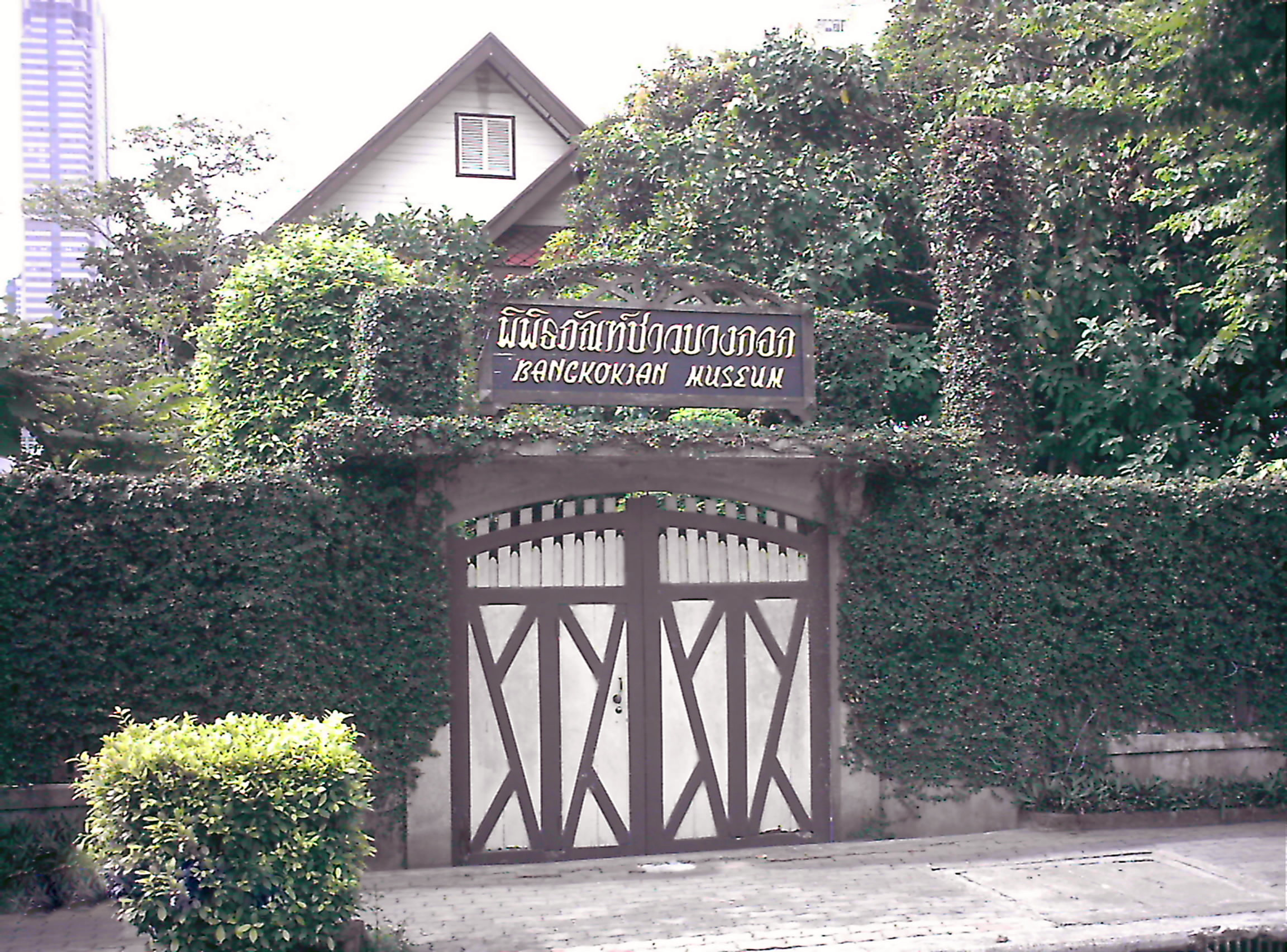
- Bangkokian Museum
- Established: 1 October 2004
- Location: Bangrak District, Bangkok, Thailand
- Type: Mid-20th century folk
- Founder: Ms Waraporn Surawadee
- Owner: Bangkok Metropolitan Administration

Bangkok Folk Museum, or Bangkokian Museum (Thai: พิพิธภัณฑ์ชาวบางกอก, RTGS: Phiphithaphan Chao Bang Kok), is a museum in Bangkok, Thailand. It is at house number 273 on Soi Charoen Krung 43, near the Sri Rat Expressway, several hundred metres from the left bank of the Chao Phraya River.

Set in a building dating back to the World War II period, the museum offers an insight into the lifestyles of well-off Bangkokians during World War II and its aftermath (1937–1957).

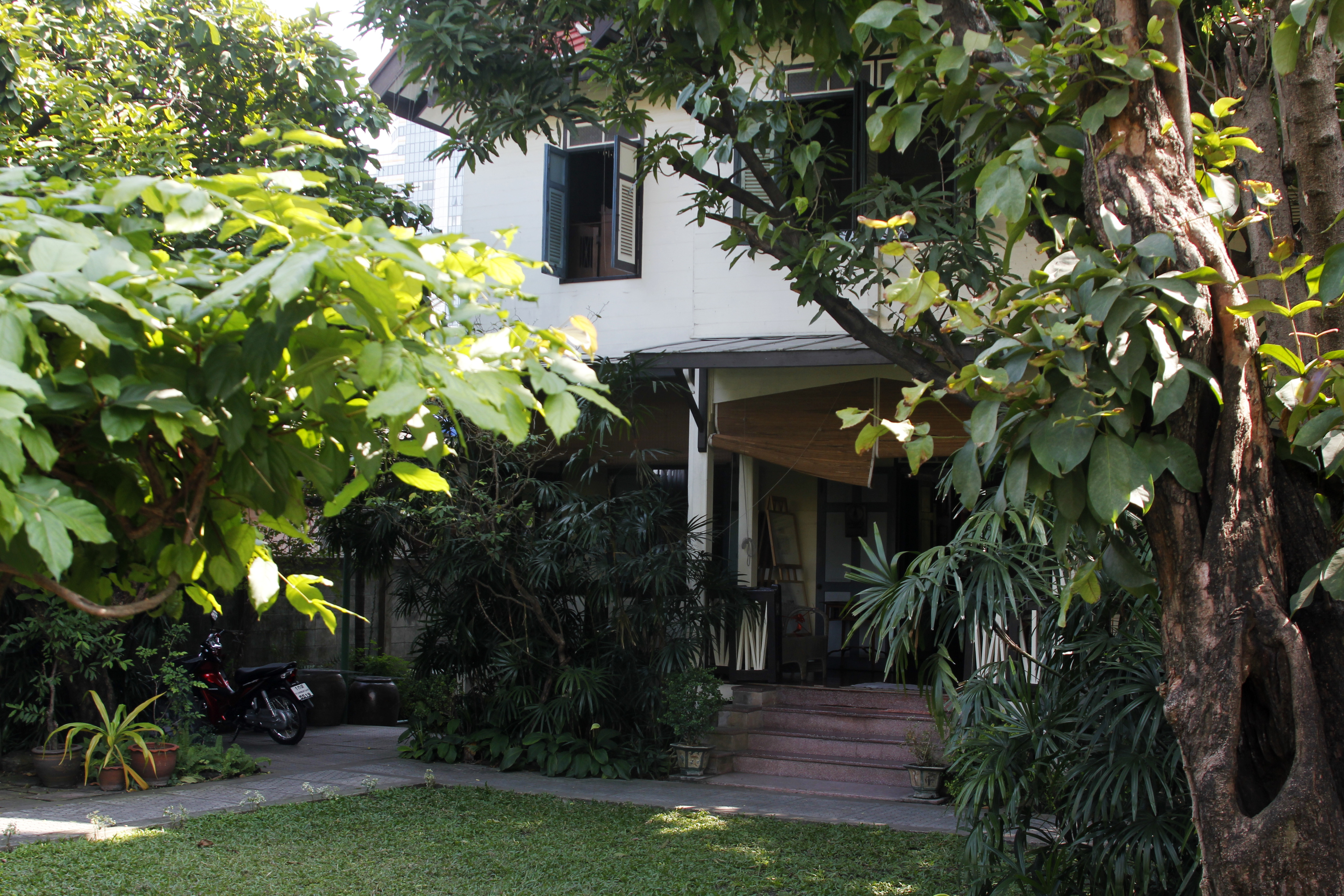
Bangkok Folk Museum: garden and main building

On 1 October 2004, the museum was bequeathed to the Bangkok Metropolitan Administration by Waraporn Surawadee who had inherited it from her mother.

The museum consists of two main two-storey buildings and a garden. In an upstairs room of the first, are the family quarters. Here are displays of many of the possessions of original family members. These include the old Benjarong jar made from Thai porcelain in five basic colors, from the King Rama V period (1858 – 1910).

The second building in the Bangkok Folk Museum is at the rear and was once intended to be the home and clinic of Dr. Francis Christian, the stepfather of the owner. Christian died before he could move in. On display are his cigar collection, and various stoves dating back to the early-20th century. One display has an old Bangkokian kitchen from the war period. Another room displays sanitation and toilet facilities during the war and has two toilets standing next to each other.

== Bangkokian ==
Conjoined with the Folk museum is the BMA local museum of Bang Rak District. It houses records of the history of the district, and an insight into the origins of the early roads and canals. It focuses on the canals and the windmills that once characterised the area.
