= Museum of Imagery Technology =

Museum in Bangkok, Thailand

Coordinates: 13.737103°N 100.529655°E

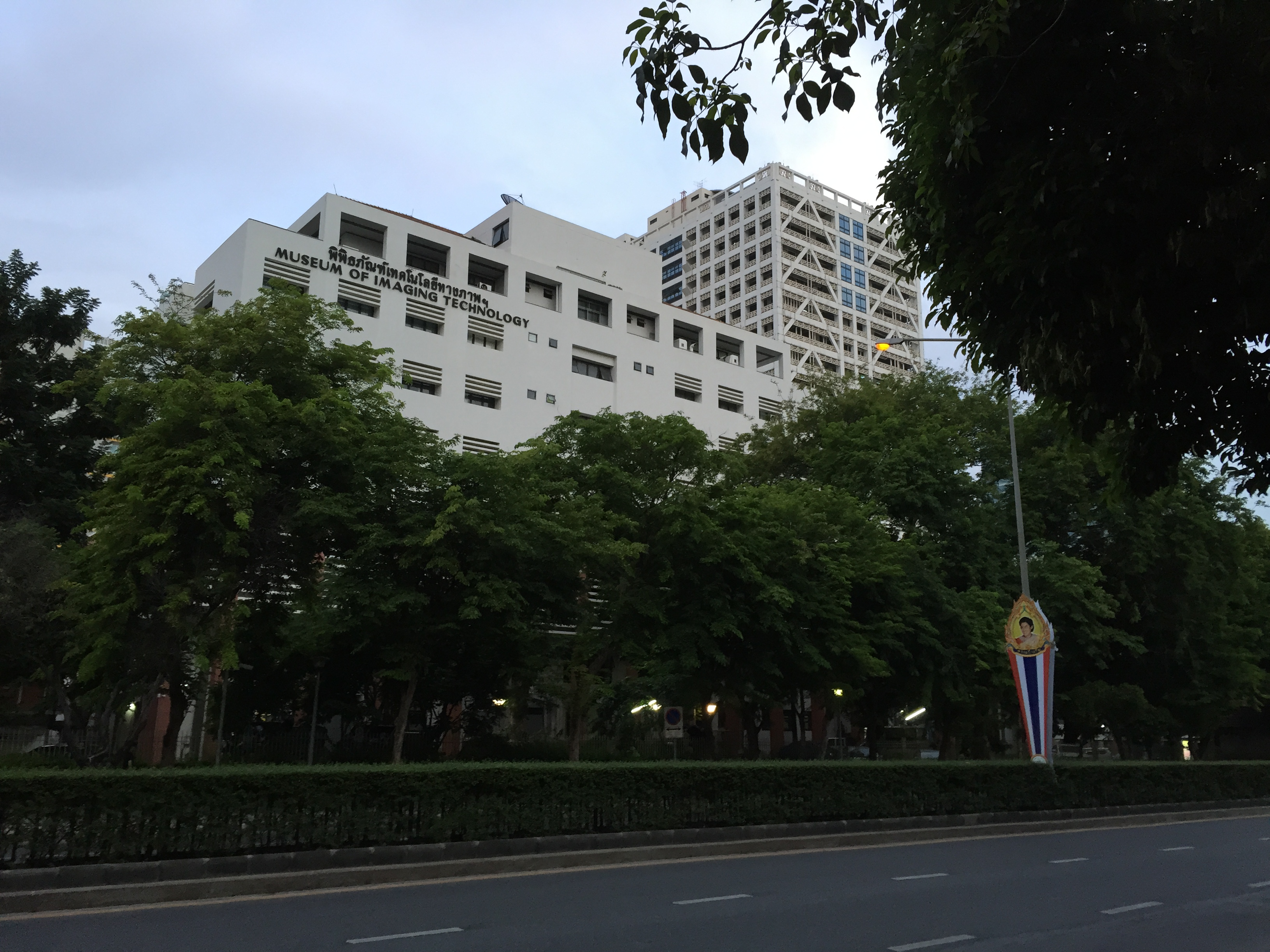

Museum of Imaging Technology is a museum in Pathum Wan District, Bangkok, Thailand. It is located in Faculty of Science, Chulalongkorn University.
