= Charoen Chai =

Coordinates: 13°44′33.56″N 100°30′35.83″E

The Charoen Chai Community (Thai: เจริญไชย) is a historic neighborhood between Charoen Krung and Phlappha Chai Roads in Pom Prap Sattru Phai district, within Bangkok's Chinatown. The community is known for being the center of the joss paper trade in Bangkok.

== History ==
Located off the northern section of Charoen Krung Road in sois Charoen Chai 1 and 2, the first colonial style shophouses were built in 1898, during the reign of King Chulalongkorn (Rama V). Shophouses in Soi Charoen Chai 1 were assigned as residential buildings, and those in Charoen Chai Soi 2 were designated to be businesses, including liquor shops, Chinese medicine dispensaries, and clinics.

The area is also known among the Chinese community as Tong Heng Gouy, "long bamboo stick".

The community was settled by Chinese immigrants, with the first group being Cantonese and later waves of Teochew becoming businesspeople and laborers.

In 2011, the Baan Kao Lao Rueng Museum, or Charoen Chai Community Museum, was established by the Charoen Chai Conservation and Rehabilitation Group.

In 2015, the community comprised 60 shophouses and 80 households. The neighborhood is now a hub for Thai-Chinese to purchase traditional goofs for Chinese rituals, religious ceremonies, and festivals.
