= Bangkok Noi Museum =

Local museum in Bangkok, Thailand

Coordinates: 13.7627°N 100.4755°E

Location of the Bangkok Noi Museum near the centre

Bangkok Noi District Museum is a museum in Bangkok, Thailand. It is located on the Thonburi bank of the Chao Phraya River near the Bangkok Noi canal. It was established by the Bangkok Metropolitan Administration. Historically the area was a rest stop for foreign traders travelling by canal between Phra Nakhon Si Ayutthaya and Bangkok.
