= Outline of Bangkok =

Capital and largest city of Thailand

Flag of Bangkok

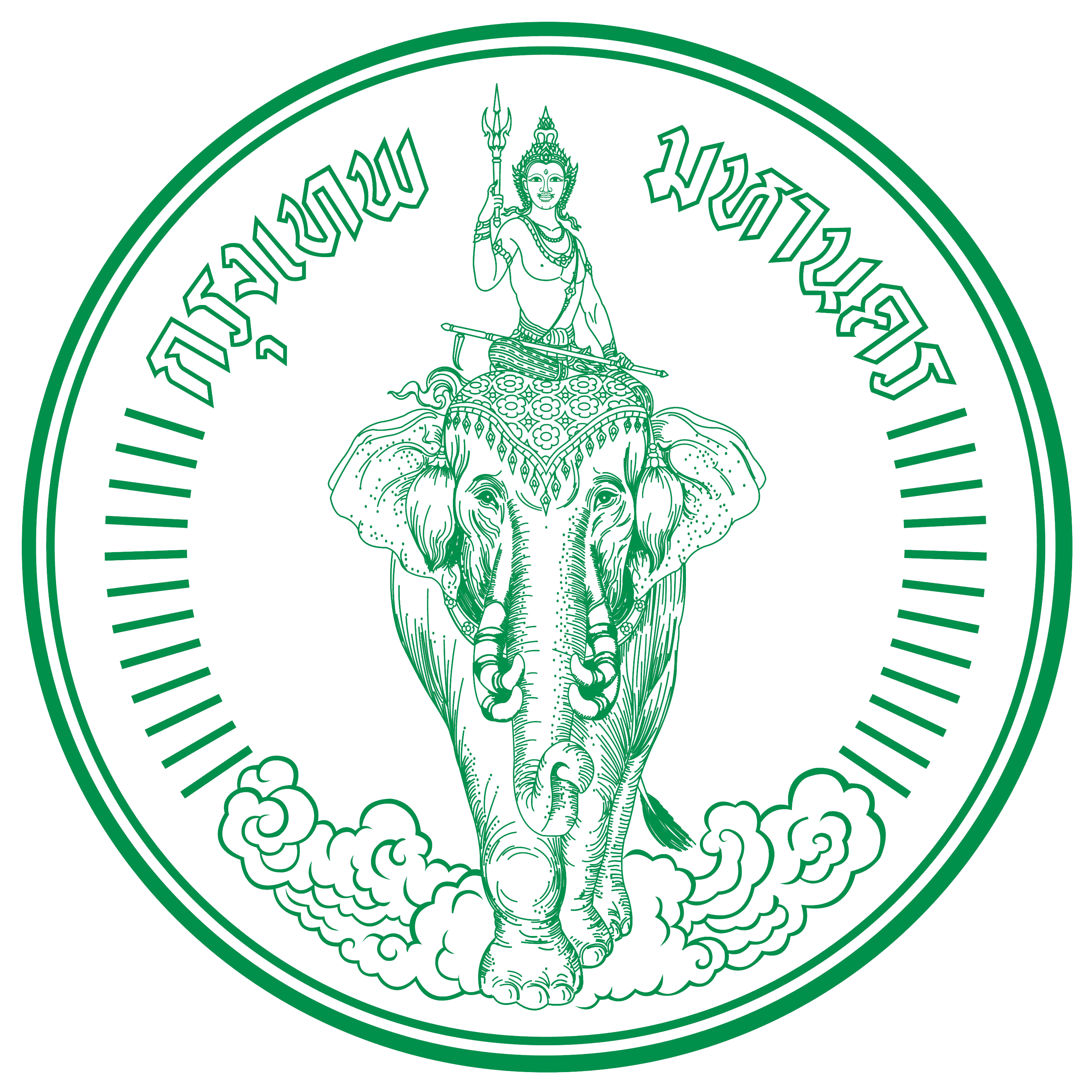
Seal of Bangkok

The following outline is provided as an overview of and topical guide to Bangkok:

Bangkok, officially known in Thai as Krung Thep Maha Nakhon and colloquially as Krung Thep, is the capital and most populous city of Thailand. The city occupies 1,568.7 square kilometres (605.7 sq mi) in the Chao Phraya River delta in central Thailand and has an estimated population of 10 million people as of 2024, 13% of the country's population. Over 17.4 million people (25% of Thailand's population) live within the surrounding Bangkok Metropolitan Region as of the 2021 estimate, making Bangkok a megacity and an extreme primate city, dwarfing Thailand's other urban centres in both size and importance to the national economy.

Location of Bangkok within Thailand

== General reference ==
- Pronunciation: /bæŋˈkɒk/
  - pronounced [krūŋ tʰêːp mahǎː nákʰɔ̄ːn]
- Common English name: Bangkok
- Official English name: City of Bangkok
- Common endonym: Krung Thep (กรุงเทพฯ)
- Official endonym: Krung Thep Maha Nakhon (กรุงเทพมหานคร)
- Full name: Krungthepmahanakhon Amonrattanakosin Mahintharayutthaya Mahadilokphop Noppharatratchathaniburirom Udomratchaniwetmahasathan Amonphimanawatansathit Sakkathattiyawitsanukamprasit (กรุงเทพมหานคร อมรรัตนโกสินทร์ มหินทรายุธยา มหาดิลกภพ นพรัตนราชธานีบูรีรมย์ อุดมราชนิเวศน์มหาสถาน อมรพิมานอวตารสถิต สักกะทัตติยวิษณุกรรมประสิทธิ์)
- Former name: Bangkok
- Nicknames of Bangkok: City of Angel, The Big Mango, New Ayutthaya
- Adjectival(s): Bangkokian
- Demonym(s): Bangkokian

== Geography of Bangkok ==
Geography of Bangkok

- Bangkok is: a city, capital city, and primate city
  - Land boundaries: 596 km (370 mi)

Samut Sakhon
Nakhon Pathom
Nonthaburi
Pathum Thani
Chachoengsao
Samut Prakan

- Coastline: 4.7 km (2.9 mi)

- Population of Bangkok: 10,820,921 people (December 2023 estimate)
- Area of Bangkok: 1,568.737 km^{2} (605.693 sq mi)
- Atlas of Bangkok

=== Location of Bangkok ===
- Bangkok is situated within the following regions:
  - Northern Hemisphere and Eastern Hemisphere
    - Eurasia
      - Asia
        - Southeast Asia
          - Indochina
            - Thailand
              - Central Thailand
                - Bangkok Metropolitan Region
- Time zone: Indochina Time (UTC+07)

=== Environment of Bangkok ===
- Climate of Bangkok

=== Landforms of Bangkok ===
- Chao Phraya River

=== Areas of Bangkok ===
==== Districts of Bangkok ====
Districts of Bangkok

Map showing the 50 districts of Bangkok. The specific districts are listed below.

1. Phra Nakhon (พระนคร)
2. Dusit (ดุสิต)
3. Nong Chok (หนองจอก)
4. Bang Rak (บางรัก)
5. Bang Khen (บางเขน)
6. Bang Kapi (บางกะปิ)
7. Pathum Wan (ปทุมวัน)
8. Pom Prap Sattru Phai (ป้อมปราบศัตรูพ่าย)
9. Phra Khanong (พระโขนง)
10. Min Buri (มีนบุรี)
11. Lat Krabang (ลาดกระบัง)
12. Yan Nawa (ยานนาวา)
13. Samphanthawong (สัมพันธวงศ์)
14. Phaya Thai (พญาไท)
15. Thon Buri (ธนบุรี)
16. Bangkok Yai (บางกอกใหญ่)
17. Huai Khwang (ห้วยขวาง)
18. Khlong San (คลองสาน)
19. Taling Chan (ตลิ่งชัน)
20. Bangkok Noi (บางกอกน้อย)
21. Bang Khun Thian (บางขุนเทียน)
22. Phasi Charoen (ภาษีเจริญ)
23. Nong Khaem (หนองแขม)
24. Rat Burana (ราษฎร์บูรณะ)
25. Bang Phlat (บางพลัด)
26. Din Daeng (ดินแดง)
27. Bueng Kum (บึงกุ่ม)
28. Sathon (สาทร)
29. Bang Sue (บางซื่อ)
30. Chatuchak (จตุจักร)
31. Bang Kho Laem (บางคอแหลม)
32. Prawet (ประเวศ)
33. Khlong Toei (คลองเตย)
34. Suan Luang (สวนหลวง)
35. Chom Thong (จอมทอง)
36. Don Mueang (ดอนเมือง)
37. Ratchathewi (ราชเทวี)
38. Lat Phrao (ลาดพร้าว)
39. Watthana (วัฒนา)
40. Bang Khae (บางแค)
41. Lak Si (หลักสี่)
42. Sai Mai (สายไหม)
43. Khan Na Yao (คันนายาว)
44. Saphan Sung (สะพานสูง)
45. Wang Thonglang (วังทองหลาง)
46. Khlong Sam Wa (คลองสามวา)
47. Bang Na (บางนา)
48. Thawi Watthana (ทวีวัฒนา)
49. Thung Khru (ทุ่งครุ)
50. Bang Bon (บางบอน)

==== Neighborhoods in Bangkok ====
- Neighborhoods in Bangkok

=== Locations in Bangkok ===
==== Bridges in Bangkok ====
- Rama VI Bridge
- Krung Thon Bridge
- Rama VIII Bridge
- Phra Pin-klao Bridge
- Memorial Bridge
- Phra Pok Klao Bridge
- Taksin Bridge
- Rama III Bridge
- Krungthep Bridge
- Rama IX Bridge
- Bhumibol Bridge

==== Parks and zoos in Bangkok ====
Parks and gardens in Bangkok

- Parks in Bangkok
  - Suan Luang Rama IX
  - Wachirabenchathat Park
  - Lumphini Park
  - Seri Thai Park
  - Benjakitti Park
  - King Rama IX Memorial Park
  - Queen Sirikit Park
  - Chatuchak Park
  - Saranrom Park
  - Rommaninat Park
- Zoos in Bangkok
  - Safari World

==== Monuments and memorials in Bangkok ====
- Democracy Monument
- Equestrian statue of King Chulalongkorn
- Wongwian Yai
- Victory Monument
- 22 July Circle
- Odeon Circle

==== Museums and art galleries in Bangkok ====
- Museums in Bangkok
  - Bangkok National Museum
  - Silpa Bhirasri National Museum
  - National Museum of Royal Barges
  - Museum Siam
  - King Prajadhipok Museum
  - Bangkok Folk Museum
  - Royal Thai Air Force Museum
  - Patpong Museum
  - Children's Discovery Museum Bangkok 1
  - Thai Bank Museum
  - Siriraj Medical Museum
  - Jim Thompson House
  - Pavilion of Regalia, Royal Decorations and Coins

Art galleries in Bangkok

  - National Gallery
  - Queen Sirikit Gallery
  - Bangkok University Gallery
  - Museum of Contemporary Art
  - Bangkok Art and Culture Centre
  - Silpakorn University Art Gallery

==== Theatres in Bangkok ====
List of theatres in Bangkok

==== Historic locations in Bangkok ====
Historic locations in Bangkok

- Fortifications of Bangkok
- Giant Swing
- Wat Ratchabophit
- Khlong Phadung Krung Kasem
- Front Palace
- Sanam Luang
- Wat Pho
- Saranrom Palace
- Grand Palace and Wat Phra Kaew
- Wat Saket
- Wat Mangkon Kamalawat
- Wat Benchamabophit
- Dusit Palace
  - Vimanmek Mansion
  - Ananta Samakhom Throne Hall
- Phitsanulok Mansion
- Government House
- Phaya Thai Palace
- Wat Phra Si Mahathat
- Hua Lamphong railway station
- Khlong Saen Saep
- National Stadium
- Thonburi Palace
- Wat Arun
- Khlong Phasi Charoen

== Government and politics of Bangkok ==
- Bangkok Metropolitan Administration

=== Thailand government within Bangkok ===
Bangkok is the capital of Thailand, and its branches of government are located there:

- Government House
- Parliament House
- Administrative Court of Thailand
- Constitutional Court of Thailand
- Supreme Court of Thailand
- Residences of the King of Thailand
- Grand Palace
- Chitralada Villa

== History of Bangkok ==
History of Bangkok

=== History of Bangkok, by subject ===
- Siege of Bangkok
- Bombing of Bangkok in World War II
- Bangkok Elevated Road and Train System
- 2015 Bangkok bombing

== Culture in Bangkok ==
Culture of Bangkok

- Architecture of Bangkok
  - Museums and art galleries in Bangkok
  - List of palaces in Bangkok
  - List of tallest buildings in Bangkok
- Museums and art galleries in Bangkok
- Nightlife in Bangkok

=== Art in Bangkok ===
- Theatres in Bangkok

==== Cinema of Bangkok ====
- Bangkok International Film Festival
- World Film Festival of Bangkok

==== Music of Bangkok ====
- Bangkok Jazz Festival

=== Religion in Bangkok ===
- Christianity in Bangkok
  - Catholicism in Bangkok
    - Roman Catholic Archdiocese of Bangkok

=== Sports in Bangkok ===
Sport in Bangkok

- Basketball in Bangkok
  - Bangkok Cobras
- Cricket in Bangkok
  - Asian Institute of Technology Ground
  - Terdthai Cricket Ground
- Football in Bangkok
  - Police Tero F.C.
  - Bangkok Glass F.C.
  - Bangkok F.C.
  - Bangkok United F.C.
    - Bangkok United F.C. seasons
- Running in Bangkok
  - Bangkok Marathon
- Tennis in Bangkok
  - Bangkok Challenger
  - Bangkok Challenger II
  - Chang-Sat Bangkok 2 Open
  - KPN Renewables Bangkok Open
- Sort venues in Bangkok

== Economy and infrastructure of Bangkok ==
- Banking in Bangkok
  - Bangkok Bank
- Commerce in Bangkok
  - Markets in Bangkok
  - Shopping malls in Bangkok
- Communications in Bangkok
  - Postage stamps and postal history of Bangkok
  - Media in Bangkok
    - Newspapers in Bangkok
      - Bangkok Post
- Tourism in Bangkok
    - Television stations in Bangkok

=== Transportation in Bangkok ===
Transport in Bangkok

- Air transport in Bangkok
  - Don Mueang International Airport
  - Suvarnabhumi Airport
- Bridges in Bangkok
- Bus transit in Bangkok
  - Bangkok Mass Transit Authority
- Rail transit in Bangkok
  - Bangkok Railway Station
  - Bangkok subway
  - Rapid transit stations in Bangkok
- Water transport in Bangkok

== Education in Bangkok ==
Education in Bangkok

- Schools in Bangkok
- Universities in Bangkok
  - Bangkok University
  - University of Bangkok

== Health in Bangkok ==
- Hospitals in Bangkok
  - Bangkok Adventist Hospital
  - Bangkok Christian Hospital
  - Bangkok Hospital
  - BNH Hospital
  - Bumrungrad International Hospital
  - Camillian Hospital
  - King Chulalongkorn Memorial Hospital
  - Manarom Hospital
  - Mayo Hospital (Thailand)
  - Nakornthon Hospital
  - Phyathai 1 Hospital
  - Phyathai 2 International Hospital
  - Phyathai 3 Hospital
  - Ramathibodi Hospital
  - Siriraj Hospital
  - Somdet Chaopraya Institute of Psychiatry
  - Vajira Hospital
  - Vejthani Hospital
  - Vibhavadi Hospital
  - Yanhee Hospital

== See also ==
- Outline of geography
