= Front-end engineering =

Engineering design approach

Front-End Engineering (FEE), or Front-End Engineering Design (FEED), is an engineering design approach used to control project expenses and thoroughly plan a project before a fix bid quote is submitted. It may also be referred to as Pre-project planning (PPP), front-end loading (FEL), feasibility analysis, or early project planning.

== Overview ==
FEED is basic engineering, which comes after the Conceptual design or Feasibility study. FEE design focuses the technical requirements as well as rough investment cost for the project. FEED can be divided into separate packages covering different portions of the project. The FEED package is used as the basis for bidding for Engineering, Procurement and Construction contracts (EPC, EPCI, etc) and is used as the design basis (or Basis of Design).

A good FEED will reflect all of the client's project-specific requirements and avoid significant changes during the execution phase. FEED contracts usually take around 1 year to complete for larger-sized projects. During the FEED phase, there is close communication between Project Owners and Operators and the Engineering Contractor to work up the project-specific requirements.

Front-End Engineering focuses on technical requirements and identifying main costs for a proposed project. It is used to establish a price for the execution phase of the project and evaluate potential risks. It is typically followed by Detailed Design (or Detailed Engineering). The amount of time invested in Front-End Engineering is higher than a traditional quote, because project specifications are thoroughly extracted, and the following typically developed in detail:

- Project Organization Chart
- Project Scope

- Defined civil, mechanical and chemical engineering
- HAZOP, safety and ergonomic studies
- 2D & 3D preliminary models
- Equipment layout and installation plan
- Engineering design package development
- Major equipment list
- Automation strategy

- PFD – Process Flow Diagrams and P&ID – Piping and Instrumentation Diagram
- Project timeline
- Fixed-bid quote

Traditionally, all of these documents would be developed in detail during a design review after a quote has been agreed to. A company using FEED will develop these materials before submitting a quote.

Front-end engineering is typically used by design/build engineering firms. These firms may operate in various industries, including:

- Automation
- Process Industry
- Chemical processing
- Construction
- EPC
- EPCIC
- Equipment design
- Manufacturing
- Pharmaceuticals
- Petrochemicals
- Process system design
- Production line design
- Refining
- Machine Vision

== FEE Methodology ==
FEE Methodology: FEE is a way of looking at a project before completing detailed design. There is no set way to conduct a Front-End Engineering study. Generally, FEE requires an engineer or a group of engineers to thoroughly and logically consider a proposed project. They may consider, for example:

- Degree of automation – depending on the application being considered, automation may or may not be appropriate. Determining the amount of automation in the project will help determine equipment, labor costs, layout, and design.
- Rates and levels – to hit a certain rate or level of, for example, production, a certain amount of equipment, materials, and automation may be required. Determining key rates and parameters will have great effect on overall project costs and timeline
- Material specifications – Not all materials work well together, or can withstand the physical application. A basic engineering discipline is determining materials of construction, material compatibility etc.
- Standards and guidelines – every industry has standards and guidelines, and many industries are regulated. Any equipment, production facilities, manufacturing lines etc. developed for these industries must meet these standards and regulations and can have major impact on costs/time to project completion
- Assumptions, Exclusions, and potential problems: FEE seeks to identify potential problems, assumptions or exclusions that could affect the project during execution. Identifying these during the front-end planning stage so they can be accounted for is the goal of FEE.

Feed also includes the outline and stages of Expansions to happen in future, although the timeline is not specifically stated for such expansions. In such cases, the plot area allocated for expansion at certain stage is usually not transgressed.

== Underspecification of projects ==
In the early phases of many projects (e.g., scoping, feasibility, conceptual design, and the procurement of some contractual arrangements), accurate knowledge about the components of the system being developed does not exist. Such knowledge will only be available in the detailed design or later phases of the project. During these early phases, the system being implemented may undergo modifications that could entail alterations to its design concept or even the system’s goals. In these phases, some goals, requirements, functions, or tasks remain subject to changes or underspecified. If the system to be implemented is unique, for example because of its novelty, size, or the expected incorporation of future emerging technologies, this adds more uncertainty about the underspecified system. The early analysis of an underspecified system could pose many challenges, yet early choices still need to be made and informed by an analysis. Early choices may involve the identification of the components that will constitute the system and the tasks necessary for their implementation. Such choices will impact many aspects of the system. For instance, early choices during the conceptual design and feasibility phases could have substantial impacts during the operation or even decommission phases. Additionally, analysts will face the significant challenge of the ‘complex’ nature of some systems, particularly socio-technical systems. For instance, a considerable number of tasks are necessary for the system’s implementation, and these tasks could entail many interactions between individuals and technical artifacts. Given the lack of specification of the system, it is unlikely that all the tasks and interactions will be identified in underspecified systems. An approach to analyse this type of projects is proposed in.
