= Bangkok Dusit Medical Services =

Thai private healthcare group

- Founded: 1969
- Headquarters: Bangkok, Thailand
- Area served: Southeast Asia
- Key people: Prasert Prasarttong-Osoth, CEO & President
- Revenue: ▲TH฿ 65.18 billion (2015); US$ 1.85 billion (2015 est)
- Total assets: ▲TH฿ 102.33 billion (2015); US$ 2.91 billion (2015 est)
- Owner: Prasarttong-Osoth Co., Ltd.
- Subsidiaries: Bangkok Hospital; Phyathai Hospitals Group; BNH Hospital; Samitivej Hospital Group; Paolo Hospital Group; Royal Hospital Group (Cambodia)
- Website: www.bdms.co.th

Bangkok Dusit Medical Services (Thai: บริษัท กรุงเทพดุสิตเวชการ จำกัด (มหาชน), stock symbol: SET: BDMS) is Thailand's largest private healthcare group. It was founded by the Thai billionaire Prasert Prasarttong-Osoth.

There are six hospitals with 34 hospital branches in the group: The seventeen branches of Bangkok Hospital, the BNH Hospital, the five branches of Phyathai Hospitals, the five Paolo Memorial Hospitals, the five branches of Samitivej Hospital and the Royal Bangkok Hospital.

The company is listed on the Thai stock exchange, and is looking to expand to other countries.

== See also ==
List of hospitals in Thailand
