= List of bridges in Bangkok =

This is a partial list of bridges of Bangkok, Thailand.

== Bridges over Chao Phraya River ==
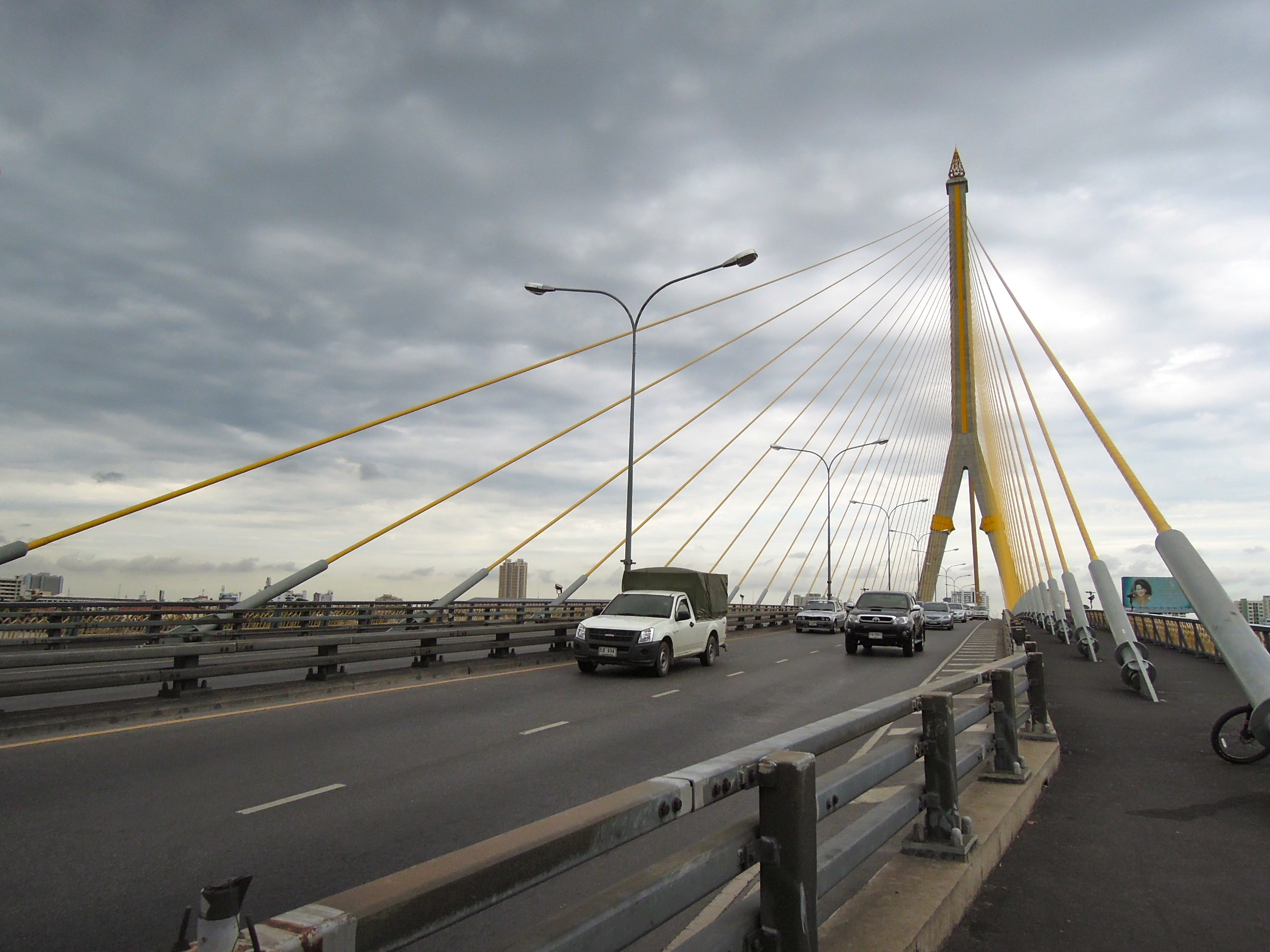
View of Rama VIII Bridge deck

- Ang thong Bridge (1980s)
- Rama IX Bridge (1987), a semi-symmetric cable-stayed bridge, connecting Rat Burana and Yan Nawa Districts, Bangkok
- Krungthep Bridge (1959), connecting Thonburi and Bang Kho Laem Districts, Bangkok
- Rama III Bridge (1999), connecting Thonburi and Bang Kho Laem Districts, Bangkok
- Taksin Bridge (1982), connecting Khlong San, Bang Rak, and Sathon Districts, Bangkok
- Phra Pok Klao Bridge (1984), connecting Phra Nakhon and Khlong San Districts, Bangkok
- Memorial Bridge (1932), connecting Phra Nakhon and Thonburi Districts, Bangkok
- Phra Pin Klao Bridge (1973), near the Grand Palace, connecting Phra Nakhon and Bangkok Noi Districts, Bangkok
- MRT Blue Line tunnel (under construction), Near Phra Pin Klao Bridge
- Rama VIII Bridge (2002), a single tower asymmetrical cable-stayed bridge, connecting Phra Nakhon and Bang Phlat Districts, Bangkok
- Krung Thon Bridge (1958), also known as Sang Hi Bridge, connecting Dusit and Bang Phlat Districts, Bangkok
- MRT Blue Line bridge (under construction)
- Rama VI Bridge (1927), rail-road bridge of the southern line, connecting Bang Sue and Bang Phlat Districts, Bangkok
- Light Red Line commuter railway bridge (under construction), running parallel to Rama VI Bridge
- Rama VII Bridge (1992), connecting Bang Sue District, Bangkok, to Bang Kruai District, Nonthaburi

== Other notable bridges ==
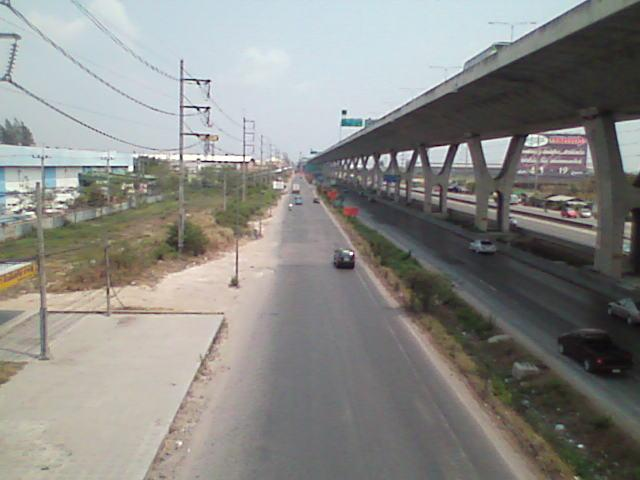
Bang Na Expressway

- Bang Na Expressway
- Chaloem La 56 Bridge
- Chamai Maruchet Bridge
- Phan Phiphop Lila Bridge
- Phan Fa Lilat Bridge
- Mahatthai Uthit Bridge
- Makkhawan Rangsan Bridge
- Thewakam Rang Rak Bridge
- Han Bridge
- Iron Bridge
- Orathai Bridge

== Former bridges ==
- Chalerm Sawan 58 Bridge
