= BNH =

BNH may refer to:

- BNH Hospital, a hospital in Bangkok, Thailand
- BNH, the Jakarta MRT station code for Bendungan Hilir MRT station, Jakarta, Indonesia
- BNH, the National Rail station code for Barnehurst railway station, London, England.
- BNH, the IATA airport code for the Boston Harbor Seaplane Base
