= Phaya Thai =

Phaya Thai (also Phayathai, Phya Thai or Phyathai, Thai: พญาไท) may refer to:

- Phaya Thai District, one of the 50 districts of Bangkok
- Phaya Thai Road, a major road in Bangkok
- Phaya Thai BTS Station, a station on the Sukhumvit of the BTS Skytrain
- Phaya Thai Airport Link Station, a station on the Suvarnabhumi Airport Link of the State Railway of Thailand
- Phaya Thai Railway Station, a train station of the State Railway of Thailand
- Phya Thai Palace, a former royal residence located on Ratchawithi Road
- Phyathai Hospitals Group, a network of private hospitals in Bangkok, consisting of:

- Phyathai 1 Hospital
- Phyathai 2 Hospital
- Phyathai 3 Hospital
