= Silliman University College of Computer Studies =

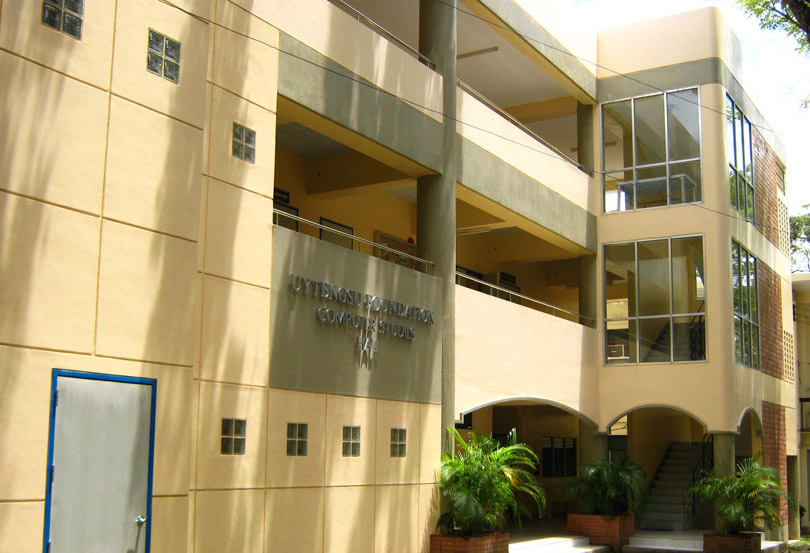
- Type: Private
- Established: 1988 (as a department); 2001 (as a college)
- Location: Hibbard Avenue, Dumaguete, Philippines
- Website: www.su.edu.ph

The Silliman University College of Computer Studies, abbreviated as CCS is one of the constituent colleges of Silliman University, a private university in Dumaguete, Philippines. Designated as a Center of Excellence in Information Technology Education by the Commission on Higher Education, the college confers three undergraduate degrees and one graduate degree.

== Background ==
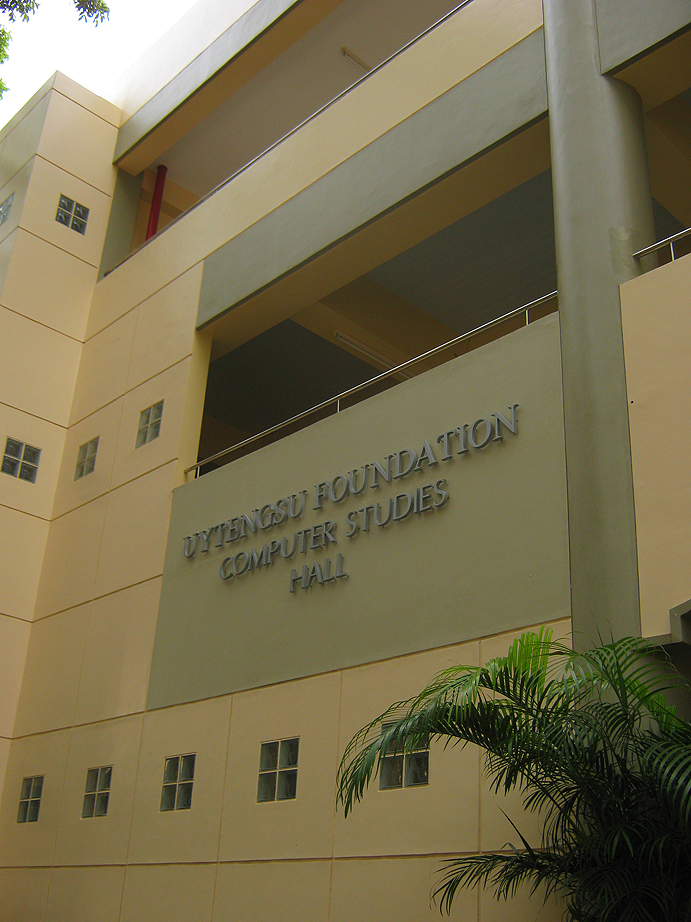
The Uytengsu Foundation Computer Studies Hall

=== Brief history ===
The College's origins can be traced to the year 1988 when the then Silliman University Computer Center (SUCC) was established to consolidate under one department all computer-related courses offered by the University. Back then, the computer center acted as a delivery unit for courses offered by other colleges such as the Bachelor of Business degree Major in Business Computer Applications then offered by the College of Business Administration.

To centralize its course offerings in one institution and to comply with the Commission on Higher Education’s thrust to regulate the number of Information Technology Education degrees, a separate college named as the College of Information Technology and Computer Sciences was established by the University in 2001 which offered Bachelor of Science degrees in Information Technology and Computer Science. In 2002, a Bachelor of Science degree in Information Management was also added. In 2006 the College was renamed as the College of Computer Studies.

=== Facilities ===
The College is housed in two buildings, the one-storey Uytengsu Foundation Computer Center, and the three-storey Uytengsu Foundation Computer Studies Hall, and is part of Silliman University's local area network that uses an extensive network of fiber-optic cables. Silliman is one of only two universities in the Philippines that has an extensive fiber-optic backbone and the only school in the country that owns its fiber-optic system. Costing US $2.5 million in 1997, this backbone connects all buildings in the campus. Silliman was also the first school in the country to use wireless Wi-Fi B2B LAN technology.

To reinforce the College's course offerings, Silliman University formed partnerships with Microsoft and IBM. The Microsoft Developer Network Academic Alliance has given the College a 3-year complimentary MSDNAA subscription which allows it to download available software in MSDNAA for free to all students and faculty for teaching and learning purposes, while the College's partnership with IBM resulted in the introduction of the IBM Academic Exchange Offering. Electives under the program are developed for junior and graduating students majoring in Information Technology, Information Systems and Computer Science.

== Academics ==
The College is accredited with the Philippine Accrediting Association of Schools, Colleges and Universities and has been designated as a Center of Development by the Commission on Higher Education. At present, the College confers three undergraduate degrees and one graduate degree.

=== Undergraduate ===
- B.S. in Computer Science
- B.S. in Information Technology
- B.S. in Information Systems

=== Graduate ===
- M.S. in Information Systems
