= SCB Park Plaza =

Building complex in Bangkok, Thailand

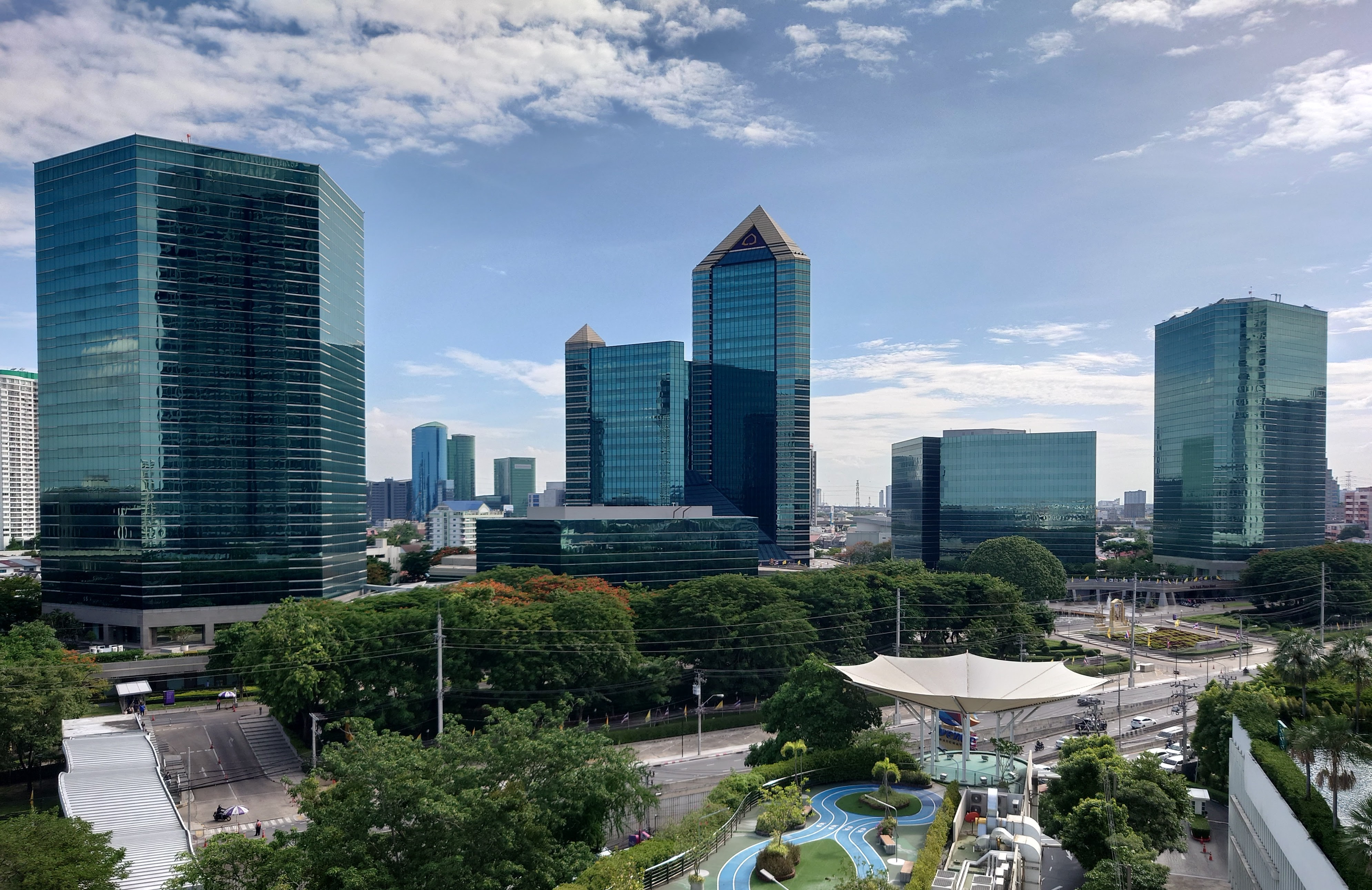
- SCB Park Plaza
- Interactive map of the SCB Park Plaza area

General information
- Status: Completed
- Location: Chatuchak, Bangkok, Thailand
- Coordinates: 13°49′38″N 100°33′53″E
- Completed: 1996
- Management: Mahisorn (Affiliated with Siam Commercial Bank)

Height
- Roof: SCB Park Plaza 1 (highest building), 137 m
- Top floor: 37

Technical details
- Floor count: 37 floors

Design and construction
- Architects: Robert G Boughey and Associates Co., Ltd.
- Developer: YHS International Company Limited.

SCB Park Plaza or Siam Commercial Bank Park Plaza is a high-rise building complex in the Chatuchak District of Bangkok, Thailand. It was completed in 1996 and houses the headquarters of Siam Commercial Bank, as well as other office tenants and retail space.

The complex occupies 52 rai (8.3 ha; 21 acres) on Ratchadaphisek Road, near Ratchayothin Intersection, and was designed by Thailand-based American architect Robert G. Boughey. It was built over four years at a cost of around 10 billion baht (US$400M at the time). It was one of the first buildings in Thailand to employ intelligent systems to optimize energy efficiency, and was unique at the time for the development of an entire complex as a single project under a common overarching design.

The complex consists of three groups of buildings: the 37-storey main tower, marked by its golden pyramidal roof, with an adjoining 24-storey section; SCB Park Plaza West, comprising two buildings of 12 and 21 storeys; and SCB Park Plaza East, with two buildings of 21 and 5 storeys. Each group rises above a connected retail podium, and is served by entirely underground parking. The design heavily features triangular forms, and all the glass curtain-walled buildings feature floor plans based on a triangular grid. A huge triangular skylight covers the atrium of the main building.

The complex houses the headquarters of Siam Commercial Bank, which received renovations in the 2010s, as well as offices of several other corporations; Unilever had its Thailand headquarters here until 2015. Designed with the goal of being an integrated city environment, the complex also features a large number of shops and restaurants in its podium mall, and is a popular destination for people who live and work in the area.

High-profile accidents occurred at the building in 2015 and 2016. In February 2015, a fire damaged three floors of the bank headquarters and killed one firefighter, while in March 2016, a chemical accident killed eight people (seven contractors and a security guard) servicing a fire-suppression system in a document vault in the building's basement.

== Gallery ==
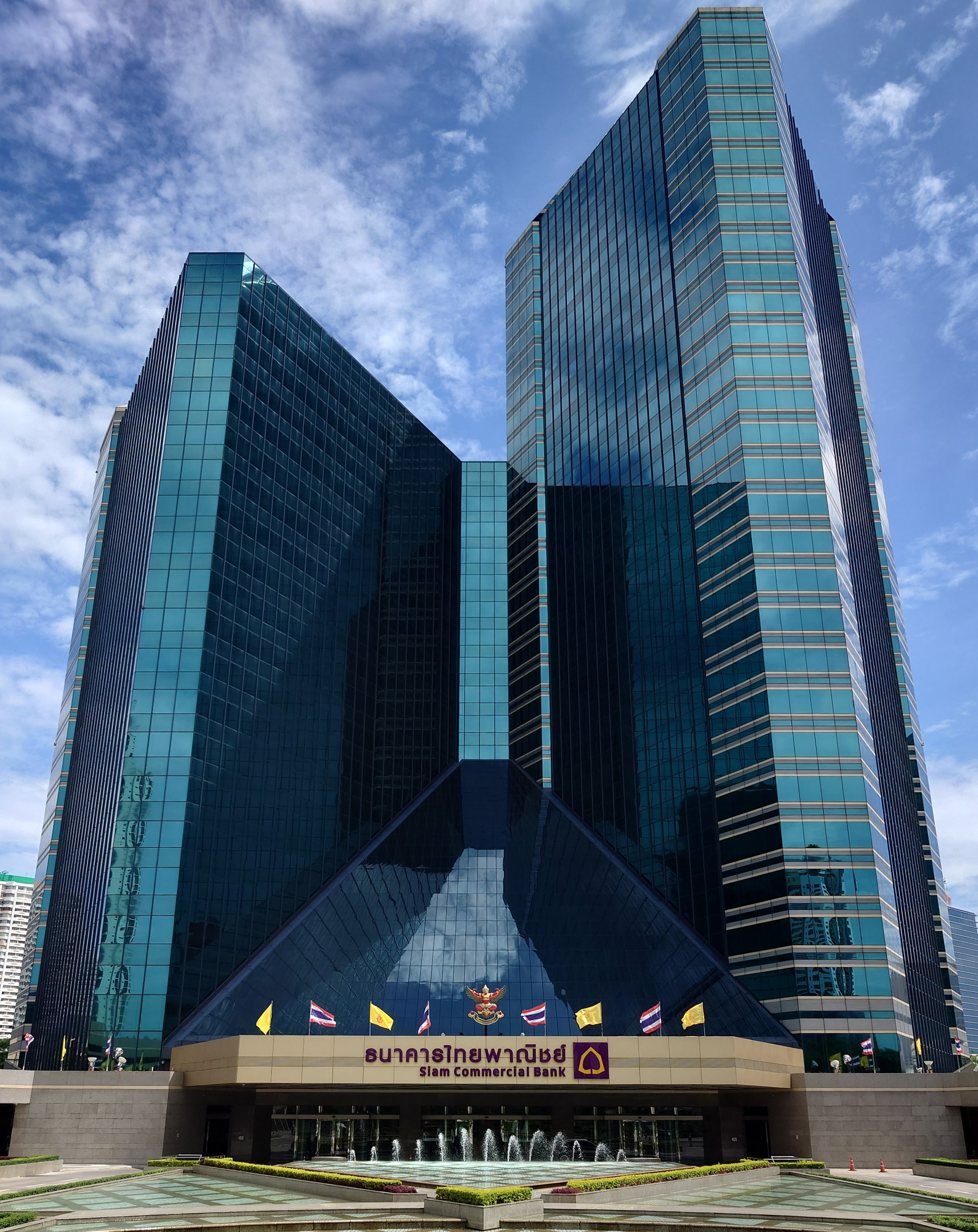
Main tower, the headquarters of Siam Commercial Bank

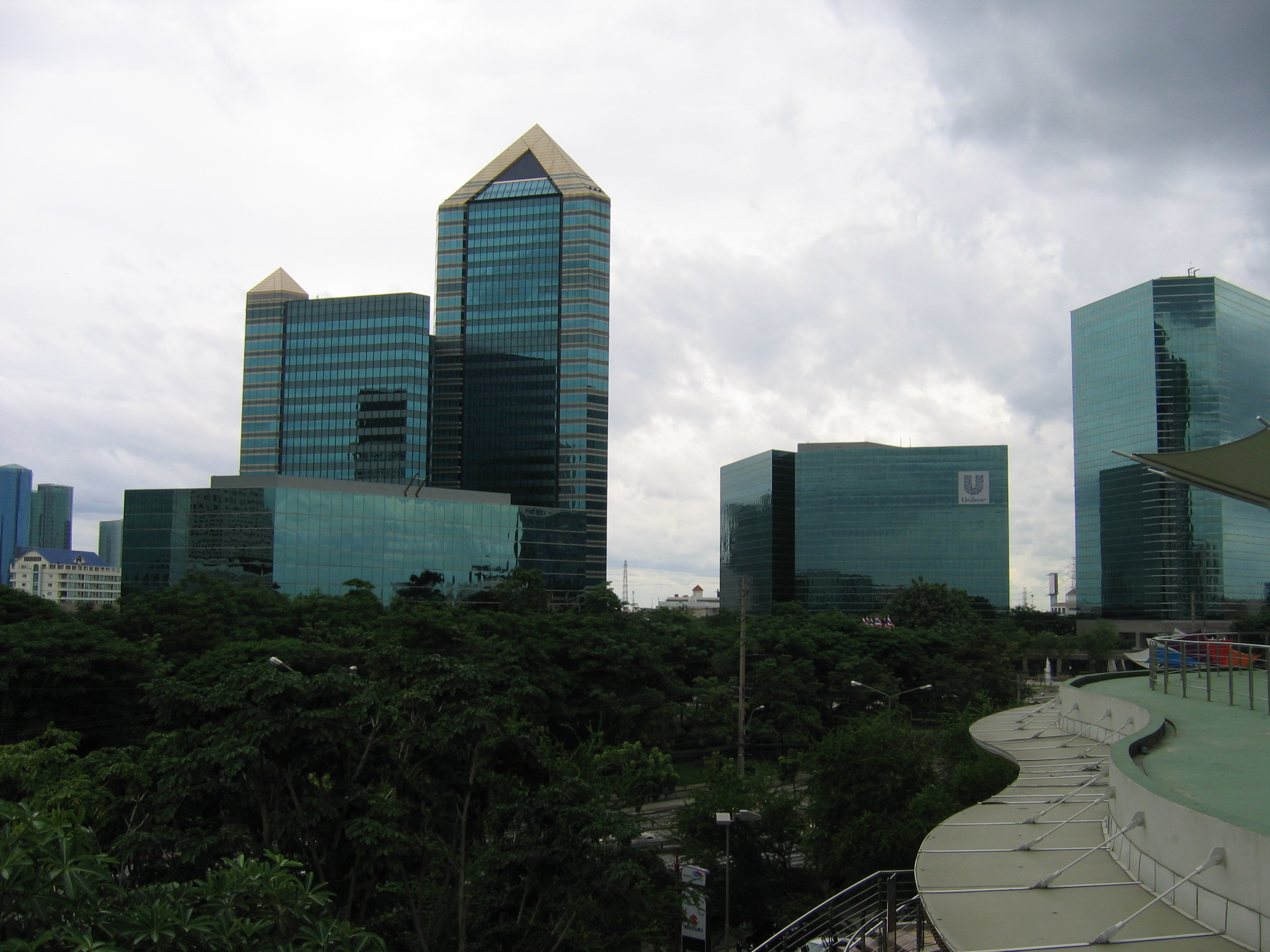
SCB Park Plaza in 2009
