= Samitivej =

Hospital chain in Thailand

Samitivej Hospital logo

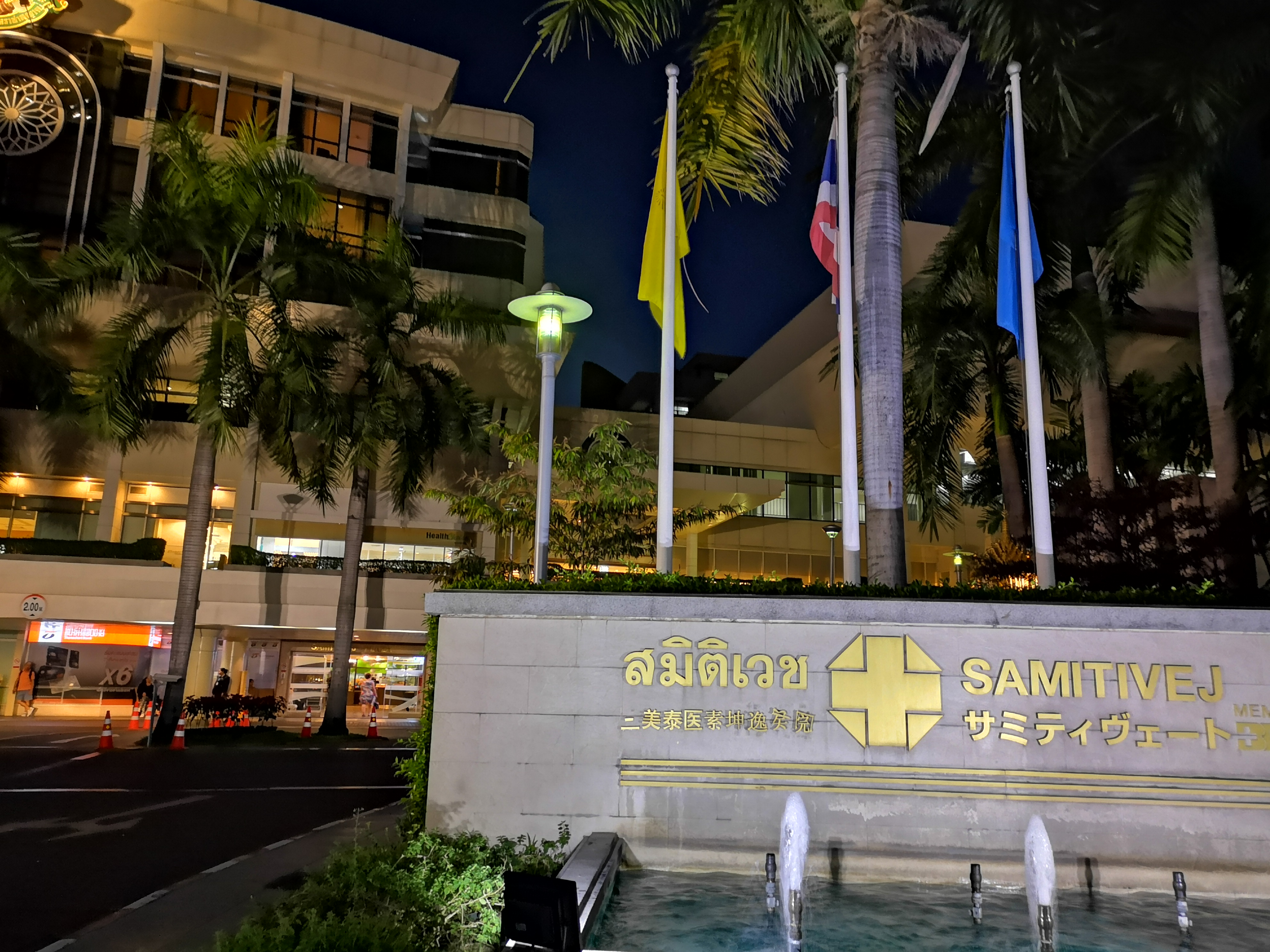
Samitivej hospital, Sukhumvit

Samitivej PCL (Thai: สมิติเวช), doing business as Samitivej Hospitals (Thai: โรงพยาบาลสมิติเวช), is a private hospital brand in Thailand. It operates hospitals and health centers in Bangkok and Chonburi Province.

It is owned by Bangkok Dusit Medical Services (BDMS), Thailand's largest private hospital company.

As of 2009 40% of the patients seen at Samitivej centres are non-Thai. The foreign patients, as of 2009, often refer to each hospital as "the baby hospital", and they are used by expatriates who live in countries with less developed healthcare systems; Rachel Louise Snyder, writing in Slate, described "Five-star service" as "the aphorism most often uttered in conjunction with Samitivej."

The centres offer halal food, and patients can get frequent flier miles.

== Hospitals ==
Samitivej Sukhumvit Hospital is on Sukhumvit Road in Vadhana, Bangkok. Samitivej Sukhumvit, with 87 examination rooms, has 400 medical specialist staff and space for 270 patients. David A. Reisman, author of Health Tourism: Social Welfare Through International Trade, wrote that "Samitivej Sukhumvit has considerable experience with international patients."

Samitivej Thonburi Hospital is in Thon Buri, Bangkok.

Samitivej Srinagarindra Hospital is in Suan Luang, Bangkok.

Samitivej Sriracha Hospital is in Si Racha, Si Racha District, Chonburi Province.

Samitivej Chonburi Hospital is in Ban Suan, Mueang Chonburi District, Chonburi Province, near Chonburi City.

Samitivej Children's Hospital has campuses in the Sukhumvit and Srinakarin hospitals in Bangkok. Samitivej Srinakarin Children's Hospital was Thailand's sole private children's hospital in 2010.
