= EPCI =

Type of offshore construction contract

EPCI stands for Engineering, Procurement, Construction and Installation, a common form of contracting arrangement within offshore construction. The acronym EPIC for Engineering, Procurement, Installation & Commissioning is also used.

Under an EPCI contract, the contractor will design the structure(s), procure the necessary materials, undertake construction and transportation and set it up at the offshore site. The contractor does this either through own labor or by subcontracting part of the work. The contractor carries the project risk for schedule as well as budget in return for a fixed price, called lump sum or LSTK depending on the agreed scope of work.

In EPCI contracts, the contractor rarely carries the project risk unconditionally. Rather, contractor and customer have detailed discussions on the division of the risk. Risk of delays and cost overruns due to lacking weather windows is an example of a typical risk that may be borne by the customer rather than the contractor.

== See also ==
- Engineering, procurement and construction
