= Silliman University College of Business Administration =

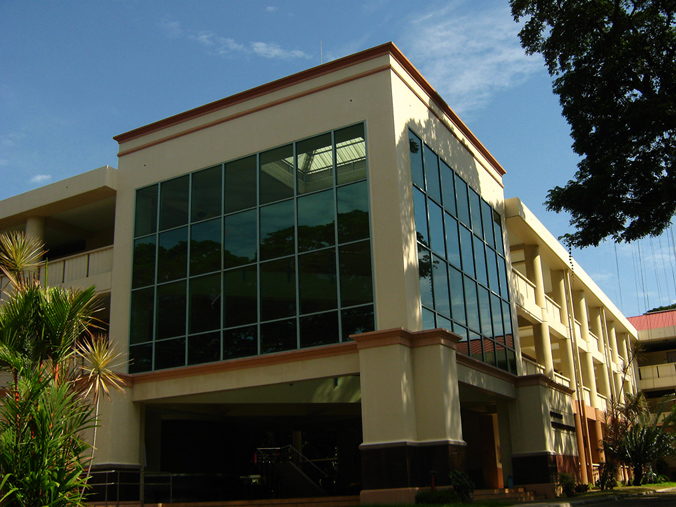
- Type: Private business school
- Established: 1938
- Location: Hibbard Avenue, Dumaguete, Philippines
- Website: www.su.edu.ph

The Silliman University College of Business Administration is one of the constituent colleges of Silliman University, a private research university found in Dumaguete, Philippines. The college was established in 1938 in the same year Silliman acquired university status. When the college opened, it offered courses in accounting, secretarial practices and economics. In the years that followed, additional programs were added into its course offerings and various modifications were made in its organizational structure.

By 1989, the college was already recognized as one of the top business schools in the country when the Department of Education, Culture and Sports together with the Professional Regulation Commission and the Board of Accountancy jointly awarded the college the Top Achievement Award for having achieved the third highest weighted averaging passing in the CPA Licensure Examinations for the years 1977 to 1988.

In 1999, it was one among 14 schools nationwide designated by the Commission on Higher Education as a Center of Development in Business and Management Education. At present, it is on Level III accreditation status, a Center of Development in Accountancy Education, and ranks 2nd in the nation based on CPA licensure examination results.

== Academic Offerings ==
=== Graduate ===
- Master in Business Administration

=== Undergraduate ===
- BBA Majors in General Business, Management, and Economics
- BS in Accountancy
- BS in Business Computer Applications
- BS in Entrepreneurship
- BS in Office Management

=== Pictures ===
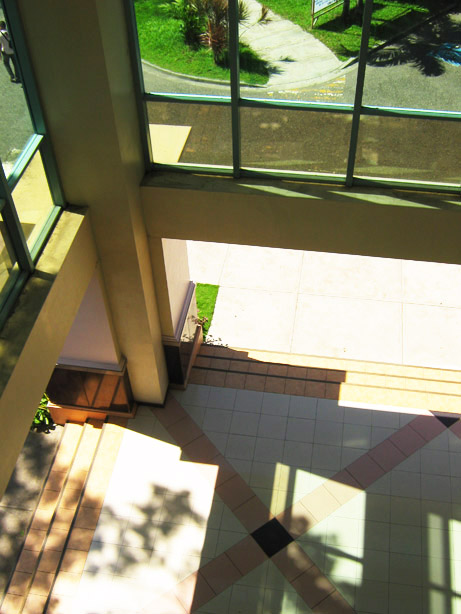
Lobby

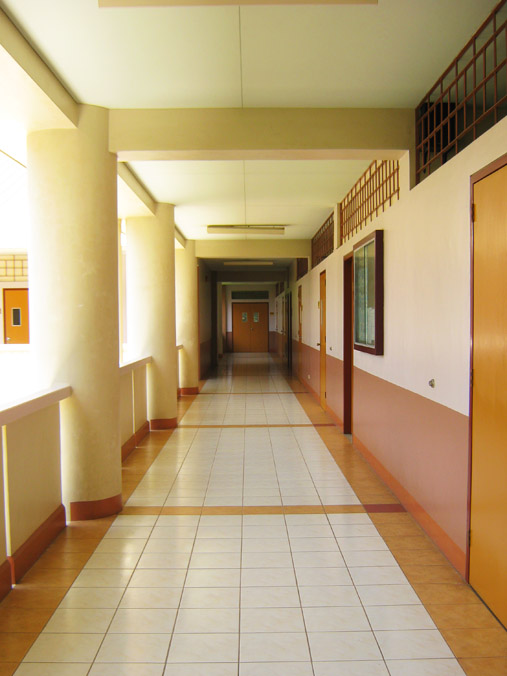
Hallway

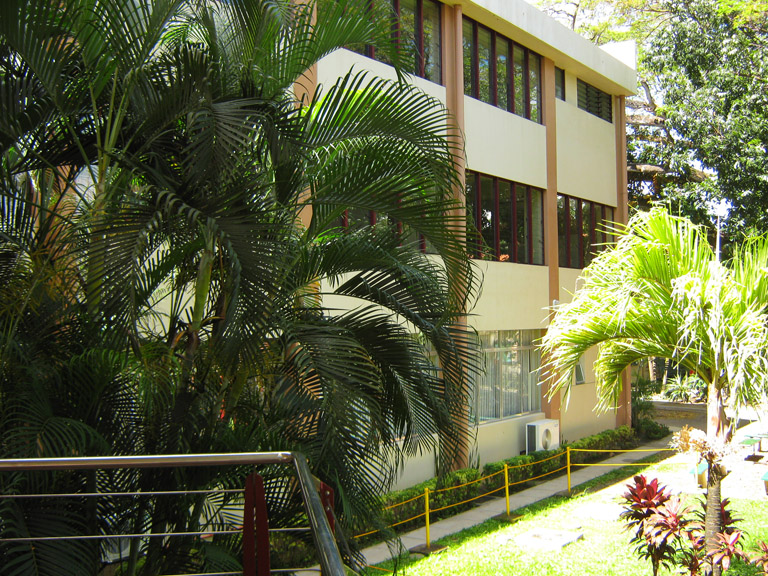
Southwing

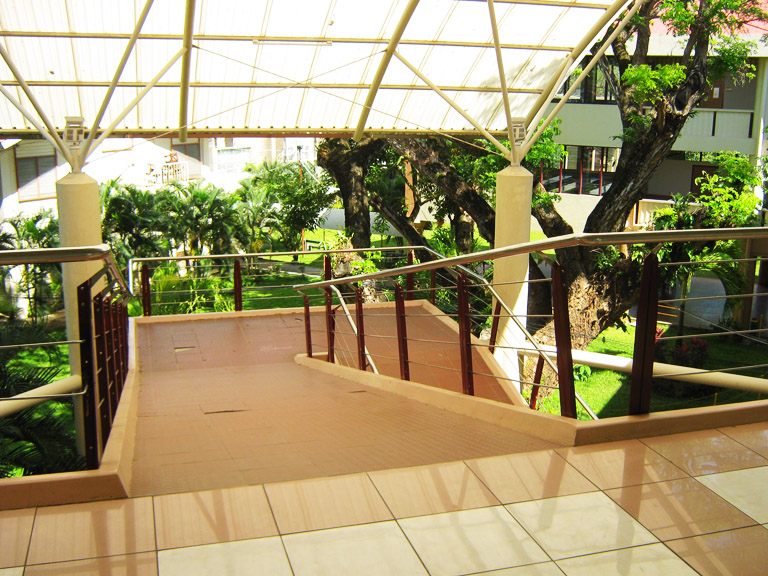
Skywalk

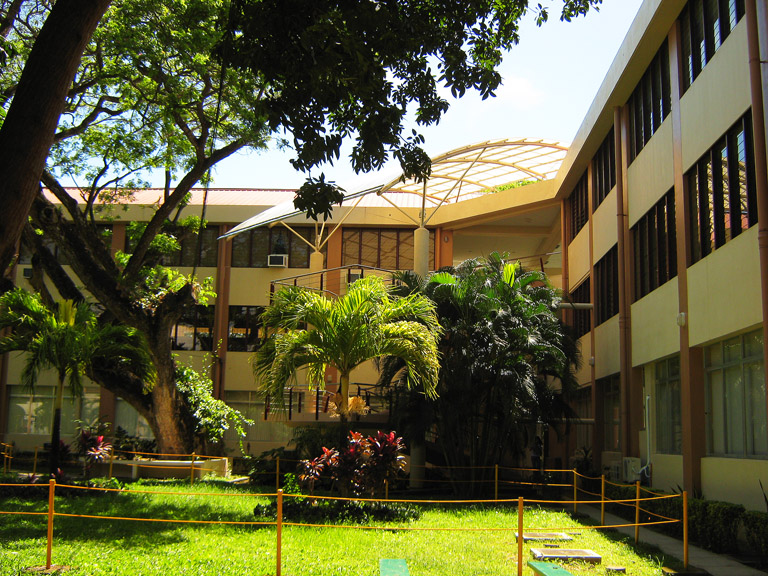
Patio

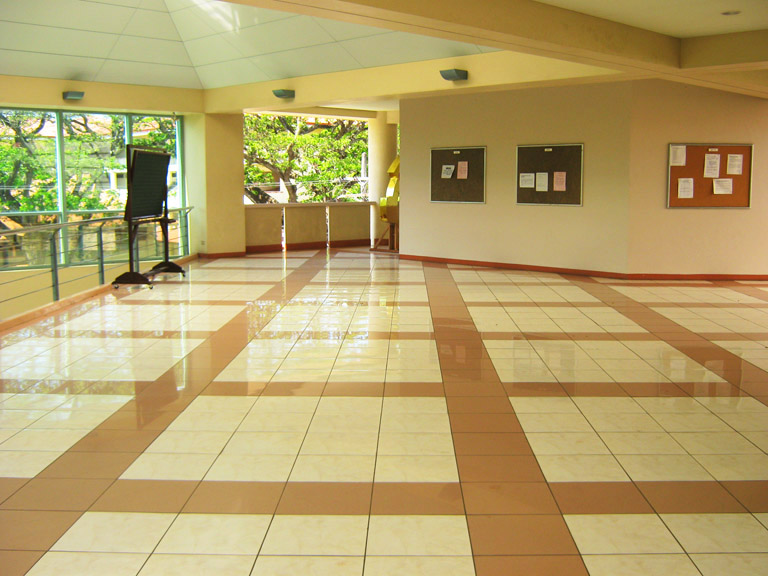
Third floor lobby

== Alumni ==
- Juanita Amatong, Monetary Board Member and former Philippine Secretary of Finance
- Leonor Briones, Philippine ambassador to the W8 and former National Treasurer of the Philippines
- Prakit Pradipasen, Thai Banker: Senior Executive Vice-President of the Siam Commercial Bank
- Ricardo Balbido, Jr., President and CEO of the Philippine Veterans Bank
