= Buckland & Taylor =

Canadian engineering firm (1972–2015)

Buckland & Taylor Ltd. was a Canadian structural engineering firm specializing in bridge design and also research and building code development. It was founded in 1972 by Peter G. Buckland and Peter R. Taylor. Both had had experience with the design of major bridges. The firm continued until it was merged into COWI North America, a subsidiary of COWI A/S of Denmark, in 2015.

== History ==
Peter G. Buckland and Peter R. Taylor worked together for CBA-Swan Wooster on the design of the Burrard Inlet Crossing over Vancouver Harbour, a bridge that would in 1970 have had the tenth longest span in the world if it had been built. After the project was cancelled, Buckland and Taylor founded their own civil engineering design company. In 1984 Brian D. Morgenstern became an equal shareholder with Buckland and with Taylor. In the 1980s the company made the decision to focus on bridges only. A significant influence was the adoption by funding agencies of the design-build process, which induced civil engineering design companies to collaborate with construction firms in the development of competitive designs for durable, economical bridges with an increased emphasis on ease and speed of erection. In 1998 COWI A/S of Denmark acquired all the shares but the company continued as Buckland & Taylor Ltd. until it became part of COWI North America in 2015.

== Design projects ==
The company has been involved with many types of bridges and facets of bridge engineering, including design, erection engineering, upgrading, seismic strengthening, evaluation, and repairs. Projects included:

- Alex Fraser Bridge, Canada, the longest cable-stayed bridge in the world when built, was the first cable-stayed bridge to incorporated the use of long lay cables, the first concrete deck acting compositely with the girders, the first use of precast deck panels, the first “tuning fork” towers, and was the first to be designed to modern North American earthquake standards.
- Conversion of a suspension bridge (the Belgo Log Conveyor Bridge, Shawinigan, Quebec) into a cable-stayed bridge.
- Replacement of deck on the Lions Gate Bridge in 30 meter sections with only overnight bridge closures.
- First use of precast concrete deck panels on a cable-stayed bridge.
- Innovative techniques for launching bridges from the bank, e.g. in British Columbia the Arras, Beaver, Parsnip, Peace River, and Wolverine bridges, the Murray bridge in Alberta, and Milton–Madison Bridge over the Ohio river.
- Sheikh Zayed Bridge, 842 metres long, is of exceptionally complex design. The two-way four lane highway bridge features cantilevered road decks suspended from symmetrical steel arches which form a sinusoidal wave.

== Selected bridge projects ==
=== Cable-stayed bridges ===
- Alex Fraser Bridge, Canada.
- John James Audubon Bridge (Mississippi River), Louisiana, longest cable-stayed span in the Western hemisphere.
- Rama VIII Bridge, Thailand.
- Ting Kau Bridge, Hong Kong.
- The Rio–Antirrio bridge, officially the Charilaos Trikoupis Bridge (Greek: Γέφυρα Ρίου-Αντιρρίου), Greece, is one of the world's longest multi-span cable-stayed bridges and longest of the fully suspended type.
- Arthur Ravenel Jr. Bridge, Charleston, South Carolina, US.
- Incheon Bridge, Korea.
- Stonecutters Bridge, Hong Kong.
- Talmadge Memorial Bridge, Savannah, Georgia, US.
- Burlington Bridge, Burlington, Iowa, US
- William H. Harsha Bridge, Maysville, Kentucky, US.
- William H. Natcher Bridge, Owensboro, Kentucky, US.
- New U.S. Grant Bridge, Portsmouth, Ohio, US.
- Ohio River Bridge (Abraham Lincoln Bridge), Louisville, KY. US.
- New Tappan Zee Bridge, officially the Governor Mario M. Cuomo Bridge, New York City.

=== Suspension bridge projects ===
- Lions Gate Bridge, Vancouver, BC, Canada. In 2000-2001, for the first time on a suspension bridge this large Buckland & Taylor designed and supervised replacement of the roadway with a stronger, lighter deck with wider lanes without closing the bridge to daytime traffic.
- Modernization of the Angus L. Macdonald Bridge, crossing Halifax Harbour in Nova Scotia, Canada, 1999 and 2015. A modernization project was undertaken in the late 1990s and completed in 1999 which saw the original two lanes and one sidewalk and utility corridor expanded to three lanes, with the centre lane being reversible to assist with traffic flow during peak periods. To reduce the weight of the roadway, asphalt and concrete were removed and special steel plating (an orthotropic deck) was used in its place. This deck is 35% lighter than the old one. In 2015, at a cost of $150 million, every piece of steel that made up the suspended spans, except the towers and two main cables, was replaced. After the Lion's Gate Bridge, this was the second time that a large suspension bridge had its suspended spans completely replaced while continuing to allow regular traffic flow during weekdays. Principal engineering work for the project was done by the same firm that managed the work on the Lions Gate Bridge.

=== Other ===
- Confederation Bridge, from Prince Edward Island to New Brunswick, Canada.
