= Chaloem Sawan 58 Bridge =

Chaloem Sawan 58 Bridge สะพานเฉลิมสวรรค์ ๕๘
- Coordinates: 13°45′38″N 100°29′30″E
- Crosses: Khlong Khu Mueang Doem
- Locale: Bangkok, Thailand
- Official name: Chaloem Sawan 58 Bridge

History
- Opened: 23 October 1912
- Closed: 15 July 1971

The Chaloem Sawan 58 Bridge^{[a]} (Thai: สะพานเฉลิมสวรรค์ ๕๘) was a bridge crossing the northern end of Khlong Khu Mueang Doem (Thai: คลองคูเมืองเดิม)^{[b]}), or old moat, in Phra Nakhon District, Bangkok. The bridge, built in the axis of Phra Athit Road (Thai: ถนนพระอาทิตย์), was opened on 23 October 1912 by King Vajiravudh (Rama VI), two years after his father's death, King Chulalongkorn (Rama V). Last structure to be built of the Chaloem Bridges Series^{[c]}, which numbered seventeen, it "was dedicated to King Rama V by King Rama VI on his father's 58th birthday".

The bridge had four pillars, one at each corner, that were topped by the royal cypher of King Chulalongkorn: "จปร" which stands for "มหาจุฬาลงกรณ์ ปรมราชาธิราช"(RTGS: Maha Chulalongkon Prom Rachathirat ; lit: "Chulalongkorn The Great, The Mighty King"). The name of the bridge was inscribed on two opposite sides at the square base of each pillar as well as the foundation date of the bridge on the two other sides as related to the Rattanakosin Era: "ศก ๑๓๐", meaning the 130th year of the Rattanakosin Era.

The trams of the Dusit Line (Thai: สายดุสิต)^{[d]} used to cross the bridge linking the Phra Athit Road (Thai: ถนนพระอาทิตย์) with the Rachini Alley (Thai: ถนนราชินี) until 23 December 1963 when the line was cut between the Bangkok National Museum and Baan Maliwan (now the offices of the United Nations Food and Agriculture Organization).

It was dismantled in 1971 when the Phra Pinklao bridge was built at that spot. At that time, the Association of Siamese Architects (ASA) and the Society for the Conservation Of National Treasure and Environment (SCONTE) called for the conservation of the structure to the Bangkok Municipality who "agreed to re-erect the bridge at an appropriate place". Part of the bridge structure was supposed to be rebuilt in Lumphini Park but due to budgetary constraints this did not materialize. It was planned instead to use the structure to extend the Chang Rongsi Bridge but this project was also abandoned.

== Notes ==
^{a} "Chaloem" is also frequently found spelled as "Chalerm". ^{b} The northern part of "Khlong Khu Mueang Doem" was formerly known as "Khlong Rongmai" (คลองโรงไหม). "Khlong Khu Mueang Doem" is also called popularly "Khlong Lord" (คลองหลอด). ^{c} The Chaloem Bridges Series started when King Rama V decided in 1894 to annually donate a sum of money to construct a bridge to commemorate his birthday. The first bridge to be opened was in 1895 ending in 1912 with the Chaloem Sawan 58 Bridge. ^{d} The loop around Rattanakosin Island was known as the "Kamphaeng Mueang Line" (สายกำแพงเมือง)

== See also ==
- List of bridges in Thailand
- List of bridges in Bangkok
- Chaloem Phao
- Chaloem Phan 53 Bridge
- Chaloem La 56 Bridge
- Phan Fa Lilat Bridge
- Makkhawan Rangsan Bridge
- Phan Phiphop Lila Bridge
- Phra Pin-klao Bridge

== Further reading and external links ==
- Pictures gallery of the Chaloem Sawan 58 Bridge
- Video of the Chaloem Sawan 58 Bridge from the movie "Norah" (1966)
- Video of the Chaloem Sawan 58 Bridge in 1967
- (1) Pictures and history (in Thai) of the Chaloem Sawan 58 Bridge
- (2) Pictures and history (in Thai) of the Chaloem Sawan 58 Bridge
