= Bangkok Hospital =

Bangkok General Hospital

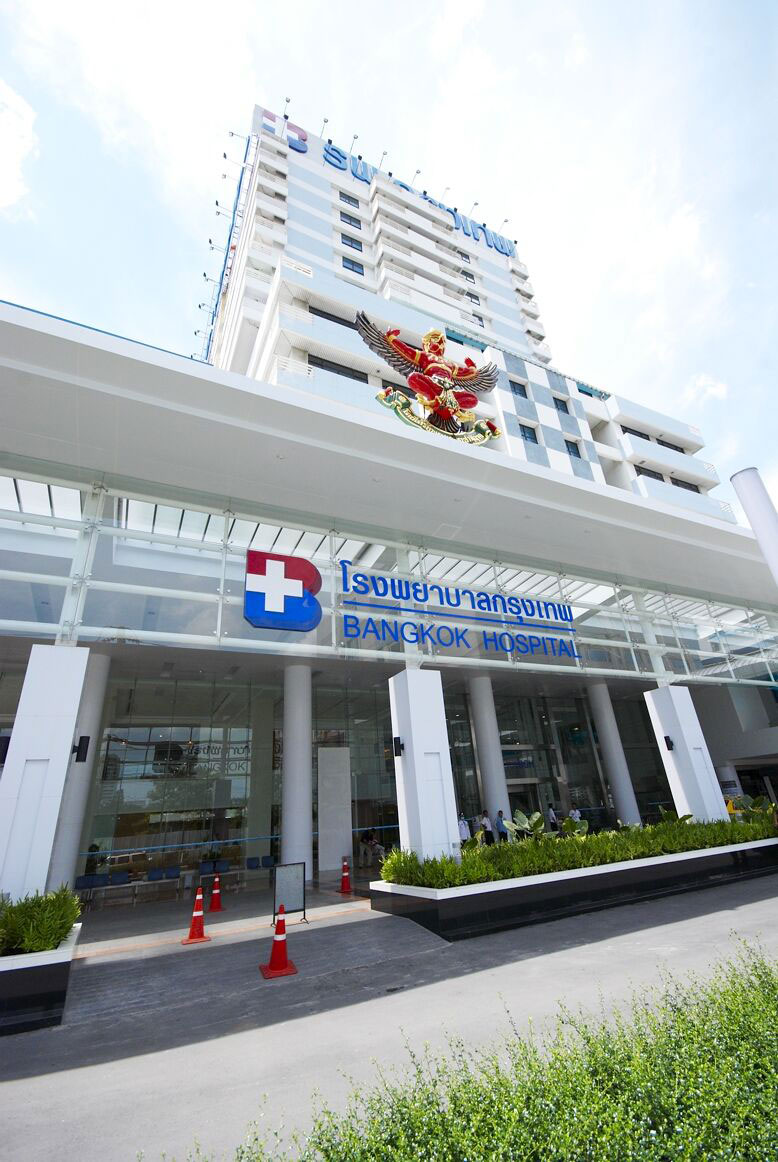

Geography
- Location: Bangkok, Thailand
- Coordinates: 13°44′42″N 100°35′6″E

Organisation
- Care system: Private
- Type: General and Specialized

Services
- Standards: Joint Commission International
- Beds: 488 Inpatient Beds

History
- Opened: 1972

Links
- Website: http://www.bangkokhospital.com Bangkok General Hospital
- Lists: Hospitals in Thailand

Bangkok Hospital (Thai: โรงพยาบาลกรุงเทพ, RTGS: Rongphayaban Krung Thep) is a hospital in Bangkok, Thailand. It was opened in 1972 by a team of physicians, pharmacists and 30 nurses. It is one of the largest privately owned hospitals in Southeast Asia. The original hospital became the Bangkok Hospital Group, now Thailand's largest hospital operator with 40 locations in major cities throughout Thailand.

In 2007, the chief executive officer (CEO) of Bangkok Hospital Group Co. Ltd. Prasert Prasarttong-Osoth received from Kaewkwan Watcharoethai, the Royal Household Secretary-General, the royal warrant appointment to display the Garuda emblem.

== History ==
Bangkok Hospital, one of the country's first private hospitals, first opened its doors in 1972. Over the past 50 years, the company has expanded to encompass tertiary care hospitals with dedicated oncology and cardiology centers. Both Thais and foreigners have consistently chosen the hospital for diagnostic, treatment, and rehabilitation services because they trust it. The largest regulatory agency for medical standards in the world, Joint Commission International (JCI), has granted it certification.

Bangkok Dusit Medical Services (BDMS) is one of the most well-known hospital networks in the Asia-Pacific area. JCI (Joint Commission International) accreditation places 14 of the 53 institutions in the BDMS among the top 5 private hospitals in the world by market capitalization.

On October 30, 1969, Bangkok Dusit Medical Services was established with a 10-million-baht initial registered capital under the name "Bangkok Dusit Medical Services" Bangkok Hospital was established on February 26, 1972. It was listed on the Thai stock exchange on October 2, 1991, and in 1994 the firm was officially converted to a Public Company Limited. 1,589.20 million baht of the company's total 1,758.22 million baht registered capital is issued and paid-up capital.

== See also ==
- List of hospitals in Thailand
- List of hospitals in Bangkok
- International healthcare accreditation
- Medical tourism
- Asian Hospital and Medical Center
- Bangkok Dusit Medical Services
