= Lump sum turnkey =

Lump sum turnkey (LSTK) is a combination of the business-contract concepts of lump sum and turnkey. Lump sum is a noun which means a complete payment consisting of a single sum of money while turnkey is an adjective of a product or service which means product or service will be ready to use upon delivery.

In the construction industry, LSTK combines two concepts. The LS (lump sum) part refers to the payment of a fixed sum for the delivery under e.g. an EPC contract. The financial risk lies with the contractor. TK (turn key) specifies that the scope of work includes start-up of the facility to a level of operational status. Ultimately the scope of work will define just exactly what is needed.

== Progressive LSTK ==
Very large projects may be split into phases where a fixed price (lump sum) is agreed at the start of each phase. This reduces the overall project risk taken on by the contractor at the start of the project, and increases flexibility on the part of the project owner to adapt the project to changing circumstances.
