= Thai Bank Museum =

Museum in Bangkok, Thailand

Coordinates: 13.8274°N 100.5647°E

- Exterior of Thai Bank Museum, 2026
- Location: Bangkok, Thailand

The Thai Bank Museum (Thai: พิพิธภัณฑ์ธนาคารไทย) was established by Siam Commercial Bank with the objective of gathering and collecting documents and tools that demonstrate the evolution and development of the country's financial and banking systems. It exhibits historical financial and banking artifacts and serves as an academic research location for the next generation of scholars.

The museum was inaugurated at Siam Commercial Bank's Talad Noi Branch in 1983. It later moved to the Bank's Ratchayothin headquarters in Chatuchak District, Bangkok, with the official opening ceremony held at the in-house Thai Bank Museum building on January 29, 1996. The museum was later refurbished on the Bank's centennial anniversary, with Her Royal Highness Princess Maha Chakri Sirindhorn making an official visit on January 30, 2007.
