= Prasert Prasarttong-Osoth =

Thai businessman (1933–2026)

- ปราเสริฐ ปราสาททองโอสถ
- Born: 22 March 1933; Bangkok, Siam
- Died: 21 April 2026 (aged 93)
- Education: Faculty of Medicine Siriraj Hospital, Mahidol University
- Occupation: Businessman
- Known for: Founder and owner, Bangkok Dusit Medical Services; Owner, Bangkok Airways
- Spouse: Wanli Posayachinda
- Children: 5

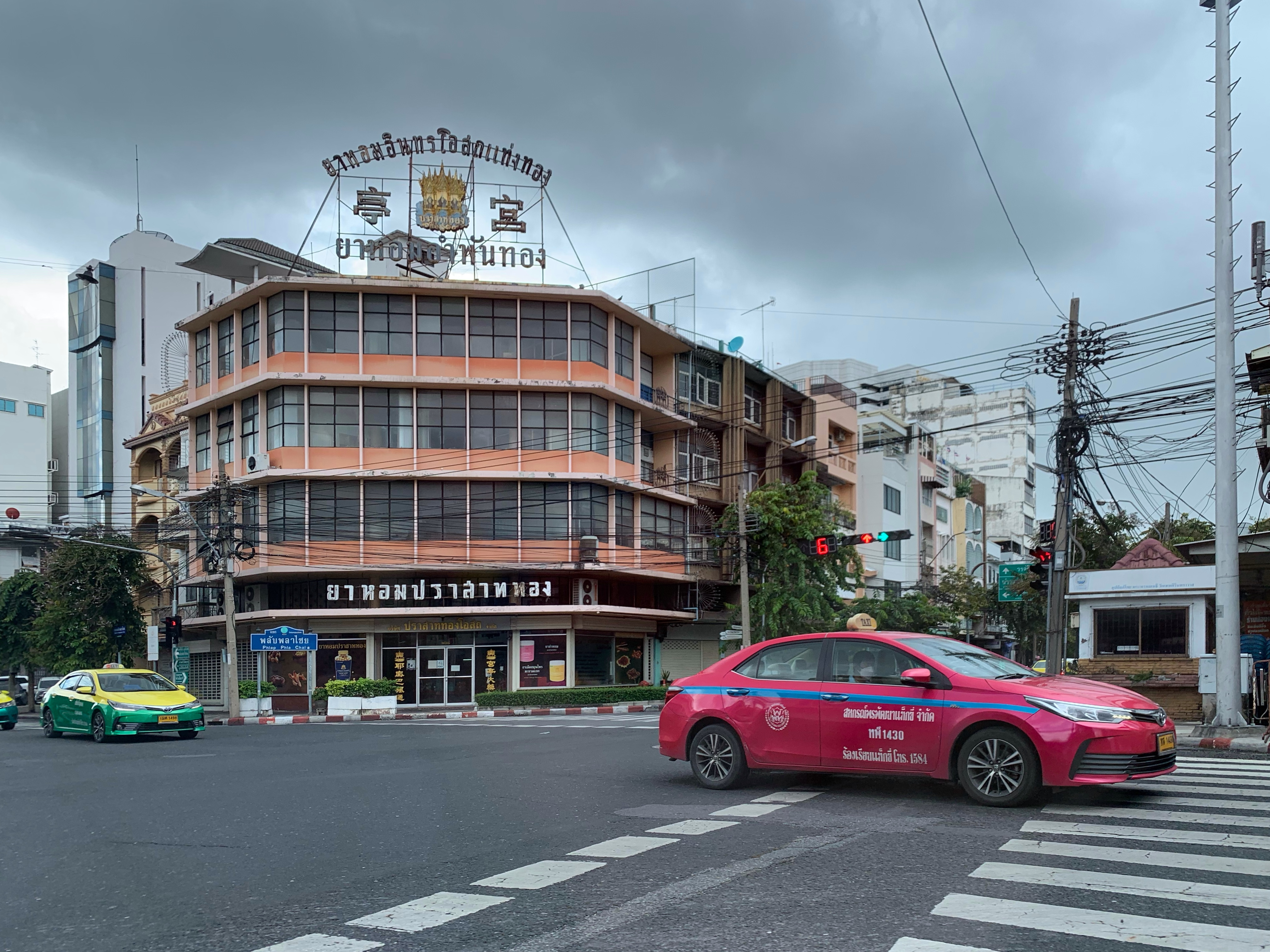
The building of Prasarttong-Osoth Ltd. in Bangkok

Prasert Prasarttong-Osoth (Thai: ปราเสริฐ ปราสาททองโอสถ, RTGS: Prasoet Prasatthong-osot; 22 March 1933 – 21 April 2026) was a Thai billionaire businessman of Chinese descent, surgeon, and the founder and owner of Bangkok Dusit Medical Services, Thailand's largest private healthcare group, and a regional airline, Bangkok Airways. As of April 2026, Forbes estimated his net worth at US$4 billion.

== Life and career ==
Prasarttong-Osoth was born in Bangkok on 22 March 1933. He graduated from Assumption College in high school and received a bachelor's degree from Faculty of Medicine Siriraj Hospital, Mahidol University, after which he qualified as a medical doctor.

He was married with five children and lived in Bangkok. In January 2019, the Securities and Exchange Commission of Thailand fined him and his daughter 500 million baht for insider trading of Bangkok Airways shares.

Prasarttong-Osoth died on 21 April 2026, at the age of 93.
