= Turnkey =

Project constructed so it can be sold to a buyer as complete

A turnkey project (or turnkey operation) is one constructed so it can be sold to a buyer as a completed product. This is contrasted with build to order, where the constructor builds an item to the buyer's exact specifications, or when an incomplete product is sold with the assumption that the buyer would complete it.

A turnkey project or contract as described by Duncan Wallace (1984) is

…. a contract where the essential design emanates from, or is supplied by, the Contractor and not the owner, so that the legal responsibility for the design, suitability and performance of the work after completion will be made to rest … with the contractor …. 'Turnkey' is treated as merely signifying the design responsibility as the contractor's.

A turnkey contract is typically a construction contract under which a contractor is employed to plan, design and build a project or an infrastructure and do any other necessary development to make it functional or ‘ready to use’ at an agreed price and by a fixed date.

In turnkey contracts, most of the time the employer provides the primary design. The contractor must follow the primary design provided by the employer.

A turnkey computer system is a complete computer including hardware, operating system and application(s) designed and sold to satisfy specific business requirements.

== Common usage ==
Turnkey refers to something that is ready for immediate use, generally used in the sale or supply of goods or services. The word is a reference to the fact that the customer, upon receiving the product, just needs to turn the ignition key to make it operational, or that the key just needs to be turned over to the customer. Turnkey is commonly used in the construction industry, for instance, in which it refers to bundling of materials and labor by the home builder or general contractor to complete the home without owner involvement. The word is often used to describe a home built on the developer's land with the developer's financing ready for the customer to move in. If a contractor builds a "turnkey home" it frames the structure and finish the interior; everything is completed down to the cabinets and carpet. Turnkey is also commonly used in motorsports to describe a car being sold with powertrain (engine, transmission, etc.) to contrast with a vehicle sold without one so that other components may be re-used.

Similarly, this term may be used to advertise the sale of an established business, including all the equipment necessary to run it, or by a business-to-business supplier providing complete packages for business start-up. An example would be the creation of a "turnkey hospital" which would be building a complete medical.

In manufacturing, the turnkey manufacturing contractor (the business that takes on the turnkey project) normally provide help during the initial design process, machining and tooling, quality assurance, to production, packaging and delivery. Turnkey manufacturing have advantages in saving production time, single point of contact, cost savings and price certainty and quality assurance.

== Specific usage ==
The term turnkey is also often used in the technology industry, most commonly to describe pre-built computer "packages" in which everything needed to perform a certain type of task (e.g. audio editing) is put together by the supplier and sold as a bundle. This often includes a computer with pre-installed software, various types of hardware, and accessories. Such packages are commonly called appliances. A website with a ready-made solutions and some configurations is called a turnkey website.

In real estate, turnkey is defined as a home or property that is ready for occupation for its intended purpose, i.e., a home that is fully functional, needs no upgrading or repairs (move-in ready). In commercial use, a building set up to do auto repairs would be defined as turnkey if it came fully stocked with all needed machinery and tools for that particular trade. The turnkey process includes all of the steps involved to open a location including the site selection, negotiations, space planning, construction coordination and complete installation. "Turnkey real estate" also refers to a type of investment. This process includes the purchase, construction or rehab (of an existing site), the leasing out to tenants, and then the sale of the property to a buyer. The buyer is purchasing an investment property which is producing a stream of income.

In drilling, the term indicates an arrangement where a contractor must fully complete a well up to some milestone to receive any payment (in exchange for greater compensation upon completion).

== See also ==
- Commercial off-the-shelf
- Engineering, procurement and construction
- Turnkey supplier
- Value-added reseller
