= Paolo Hospital Kaset =

Paolo Hospital Kaset โรงพยาบาลเปาโล เกษตร

Geography
- Location: Phahonyothin Road, Sena Nikhom, Chatuchak, Bangkok, Thailand
- Coordinates: 13.83533°N 100.574007°E

Organisation
- Care system: Private

Services
- Emergency department: Yes
- Beds: 162

History
- Opened: 1968

Links
- Lists: Hospitals in Thailand

Paolo Hospital Kaset, formerly Mayo Hospital, is a private hospital on Phahonyothin Road in Chatuchak District in Bangkok, Thailand.
