= Rama VIII Bridge =

Rama VIII Bridge สะพานพระราม ๘
- Rama VIII Bridge at night in 2026
- Coordinates: 13°46′9″N 100°29′48.5″E
- Carries: Road traffic & pedestrians
- Crosses: Chao Phraya River
- Locale: Bangkok, Thailand
- Maintained by: Bangkok Metropolitan Administration

Characteristics
- Design: Cable-stayed
- Total length: 475 m (1,558 ft)
- Height: 160 m (520 ft)
- Longest span: 300 m (980 ft)
- Clearance below: 10.4 m (34 ft)

History
- Engineering design by: Buckland & Taylor
- Constructed by: China State Construction Engineering; PPD Construction
- Fabrication by: BBR Systems
- Construction start: 1999
- Construction end: 2002
- Opened: 7 May 2002
- Inaugurated: 20 September 2002

Statistics
- Daily traffic: 72,873 (Note: 2011 weekday average)

Location
- Interactive map of Rama VIII Bridge

The Rama VIII Bridge (Thai: สะพานพระราม ๘, RTGS: Saphan Phra Ram Paet, pronounced [sā.pʰāːn pʰráʔ rāːm pɛ̀ːt]) is a cable-stayed bridge crossing the Chao Phraya River in Bangkok, Thailand. It was built to alleviate traffic congestion on the nearby Phra Pinklao Bridge. Construction of the bridge took place from 1999 to 2002. The bridge was opened on 7 May 2002 and inaugurated on 20 September, the birth anniversary of the late King Ananda Mahidol (Rama VIII), after whom it is named. The bridge has an asymmetrical design, with a single pylon in an inverted Y shape on the west bank of the river. Its eighty-four cables are arranged in pairs on the side of the main span and in a single row on the other. The bridge has a main span of 300 metres (980 ft), and was one of the world's largest asymmetrical cable-stayed bridges at the time of its completion.

== Conception and construction ==
Bangkok is divided by the Chao Phraya River into the main eastern part and Thonburi in the west, with several road bridges linking both sides of the city. By the mid-1990s, traffic congestion on these crossings had become particularly severe. Phra Pinklao Bridge, in particular, was regarded as the worst. With suggestions from King Bhumibol Adulyadej, the Bangkok Metropolitan Administration commissioned studies for the construction of a new bridge north of Phra Pinklao Bridge to alleviate that congestion.

The BMA contracted the British company Mott MacDonald and Thai companies Epsilon and P & Cigna to perform the preliminary survey and designs. Bidding on the project began in 1996, but was halted due to the 1997 Asian financial crisis. The project was revived in 1998 and was awarded as a lump-sum turnkey contract to a joint venture consisting of the Canadian company Buckland & Taylor Ltd., the China State Construction Engineering Corporation, Switzerland-based company BBR Systems Ltd., and the Bangkok-based PPD Construction Co., Ltd. The bridge's design was provided by Buckland & Taylor; its engineers Jorge Torrejon and Don Bergman served as project manager and chief engineer for design, respectively. Both had previously worked on the Alex Fraser Bridge in Vancouver, which was the world's longest cable-stayed bridge for five years following its completion in 1986. Construction of the bridge was carried out by the China State Construction Engineering Corp. BBR Systems supplied and installed the cables, and PPD Construction designed the viaducts. London-based Yee Associates served as architect, and Scott Wilson Kirkpatrick (Thailand) provided design management and site services.

Construction of the bridge began in 1999, and was completed in 2002. It was opened to traffic on 7 May that year. The bridge was named in tribute to King Bhumibol's brother, the late King Ananda Mahidol, who was also known as Rama VIII as he was the eighth king of the Chakri Dynasty. The bridge was inaugurated by King Bhumibol on 20 September 2002, the anniversary of Ananda Mahidol's birth.

== Design ==
The bridge is of an asymmetrical design, with a single pylon located on the Thonburi bank of the river. The pylon, which is 160 metres (520 ft) tall, is in the shape of an upside-down Y standing on two legs. The bridge deck passes through the legs of the pylon, carrying two carriageways of two lanes each, as well as shared pedestrian and cycle ways on both sides. Fifty-six cables, arranged in two planes in a semi-fan configuration, support the 300-metre (980 ft)-long main span, while another twenty-eight cables arranged in a single plane with a near-harp configuration connect the tower to the median of the anchor span. Most of the bridge, which is 475 metres (1,558 ft) in length, is constructed of reinforced and prestressed concrete, except for the main span, which has a steel structure with a composite concrete deck. At its completion, the bridge was one of the world's largest asymmetric cable-stayed bridges.

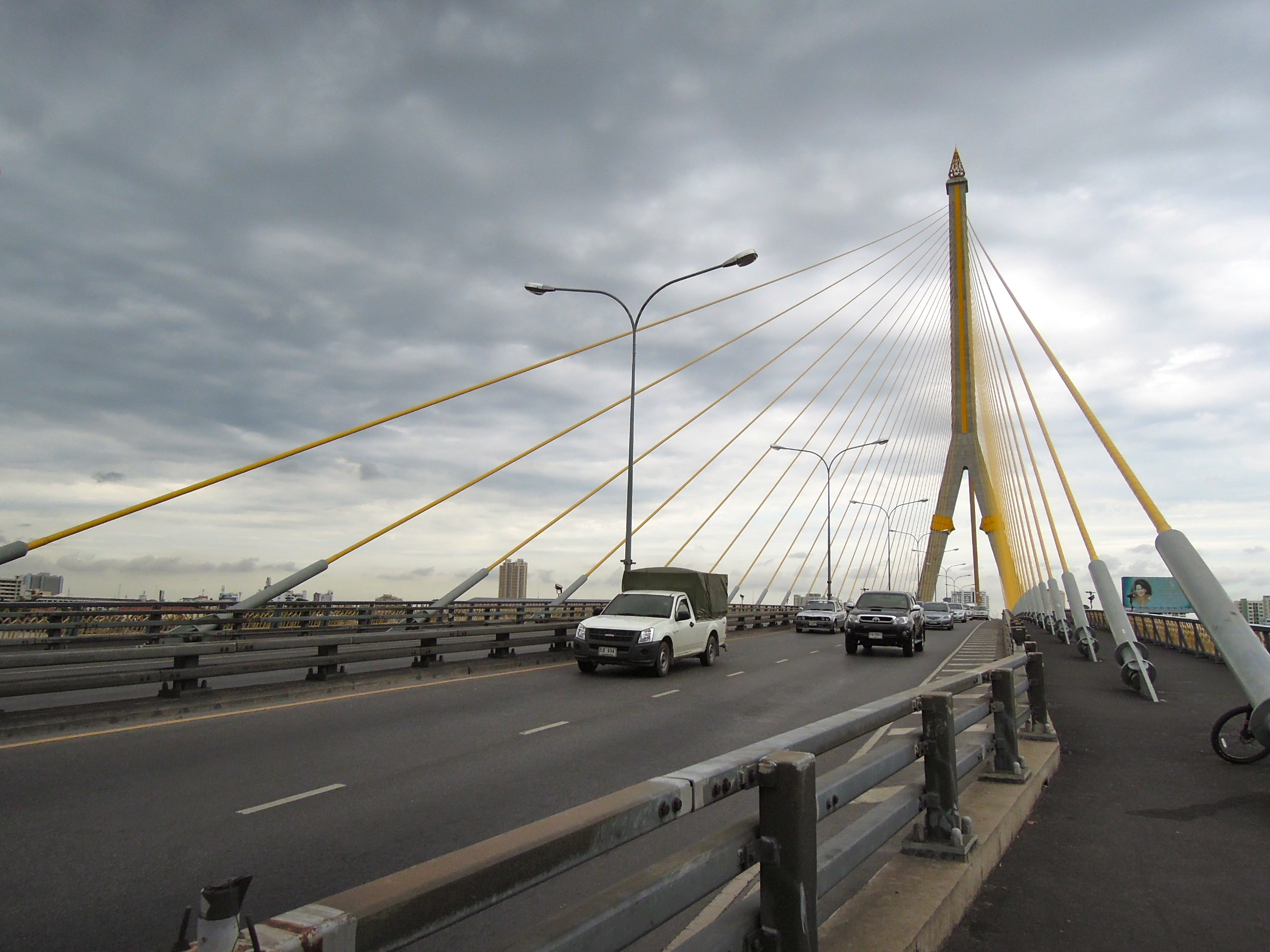
View of the bridge deck

The bridge's architectural elements include lotus motifs, which appear in the pedestrian railings, as well as references to King Ananda Mahidol. The cables have gold-coloured sheaths, and other steel elements are painted accordingly. The bases of the tower are enclosed in octagonal enclosures resembling the feet of an elephant. The top of the tower features a glass observation deck, which is enclosed in a 15-metre-tall (49 ft) metal frame in the shape of a lotus bud and is accessible by a lift inside the tower. It is the tallest bridge observation deck in the world, but is not currently open to the public. Viaducts connect the bridge to Wisut Kasat Road on the east side of the river and Arun Amarin Road and the Borommaratchachonnani Elevated Highway on the west side. Lift towers and stairs allow pedestrian access to the bridge from each bank. The area around the base of the pylon has been developed into a public park. It features a larger-than-life statue of Ananda Mahidol, which was unveiled by King Bhumibol on 9 June 2012.

The bridge received several engineering awards: the 2003 Eugene C. Figg Jr. Medal For Signature Bridges, given by the Engineers' Society of Western Pennsylvania; a 2003 Award of Excellence from Canadian Consulting Engineer, given to Buckland & Taylor for its design of the bridge; and an Award of Merit at the 14th Annual CEBC (Consulting Engineers of British Columbia) Awards for Engineering Excellence. The bridge is depicted on the back of the Series 15 twenty baht banknotes, behind a portrait of King Ananda Mahidol.

== Major repairs ==
The 2 September 2017 issue of the front page of the Bangkok Post shows the Rama VIII bridge with the caption, "Troubled bridge over water." A one-sentence note explains that damage has been detected in several places on the bridge structure, especially the suspension cables. The bridge will undergo "...major repairs and maintenance work."
