= List of theatres in Bangkok =

Bangkok is home to a number of theatres, which usually feature traditional performances such as the khon masked dance, or modern Western theatre–influenced plays and performances.

== List of theatres ==
=== Government institutions ===
- National Theatre

=== Academic institutions ===
These theatres serve their respective academic theatre programmes.

- Nakarin Theatre, Srinakharinwirot University
- Patravadi Theatre (by Patravadi Mejudhon)
- Sodsai Pantoomkomol Centre for Dramatic Arts, Chulalongkorn University

=== Commercial theatres ===
These commercial establishments show a wide range of programmes, both local and imported.

- Aksra Theatre
- Calypso Cabaret, Asiatique
- M Theatre
- Muangthai Rachadalai Theatre, The Esplanade
- Sala Chalermkrung Royal Theatre
- Siam Niramit (until 2021)

=== Multi-purpose venues ===
These multi-purpose venues are sometimes used for theatrical productions.

- CenterPoint Playhouse, CentralWorld
- Impact Arena
- Royal Paragon Hall
- Thailand Cultural Centre

=== Small theatre spaces ===
These are usually rented to small independent theatre groups.

- BlueBox Studio, M Theatre
- Crescent Moon Space, Pridi Banomyong Institute
- Democrazy Theatre Studio

== See also ==
- List of cinemas in Thailand
