= List of analog television stations in Thailand =

List of former analog TV frequencies in Thailand.

Analog television broadcasting in Thailand began on June 24, 1955 (in FCC 525-line NTSC), and Color telecasts (PAL, System B/G 625 lines) were started in 1967; full-time color transmissions were launched in 1975, while state-owned regional television began broadcasting in 1959. Analog broadcasting ended on March 26, 2020. Channel 3 HD was the last TV channel to broadcast in analog before the expiration of the franchise.

== Bangkok ==
Station	Channel	Location	ERP Power
Channel 5	E5 VHF	Sanam Pao	400 kW ERP
Channel 7	E7 VHF	Sanam Pao	377 kW ERP
Channel 9	E9 VHF	Baiyoke Tower II	400 kW ERP
Channel 11 NBT	E11 VHF	Baiyoke Tower II	468 kW ERP
Thai PBS	E29 UHF	Baiyoke Tower II	1000 kW ERP
Channel 3	E32 UHF	Baiyoke Tower II	210 kW ERP

== Bueng Kan ==
Station	Channel	Location	ERP Power
Channel 11 NBT	E26 UHF	Mueang District	1 kW
Thai PBS	E29 UHF	Mueang District	1 kW

== Buriram ==
Station	Channel	Location	ERP Power
Channel 7	E3 VHF	Khao Kradong	10 kW
Channel 5	E5 VHF	Khao Kradong	10 kW
Thai PBS	E28 UHF	Non Su Wan District	10 kW

== Chaiyaphum ==
Station	Channel	Location	ERP Power
Thai PBS	E28 UHF	Chaiyaphum - Si Khiw Road	2 kW 20 kW ERP
Channel 11 NBT	E31 UHF	Ban Nong Raeng, Tambon Bueng Khla, Mueang District	5 kW 100 kW ERP
Channel 5	E49 UHF	Ban Li, Tambon Lahan, Chatturat District	3 kW 30 kW ERP

== Chanthabuuri ==
Station	Channel	Location	ERP Power
Channel 11 NBT	E38	Mueang District	2 kW

== Chiang Mai ==
Station	Channel	Location	ERP Power
Channel 5	E5	Tambon Don Kaeo, Mae Rim District	10 kW
Channel 7	E7	Mae Rim District	10 kW
Channel 9	E9	Doi Suthep, Tambon Suthep, Mueang District	10 kW
Channel 11 NBT	E11	Doi Suthep, Mueang District	10 kW
Thai PBS	E34	Doi Pha Hong, Chai Prakan District	10 kW
Channel 3	E46	Doi Suthep, Tambon Suthep, Mueang District	10 kW

== Chiang Rai ==
Station	Channel	Location	ERP Power
Channel 9	E4	Doi Pui, Tambon San Sai, Mueang District	10 kW
Channel 7	E6	Mae Chan District	10 kW
Channel 3	E8	Doi Pui, Tambon San Sai, Mueang District	10 kW
Channel 11 NBT	E10	Doi Pui, Tambon San Sai, Mueang District	10 kW
Channel 5	E12	Doi Pasak, Mae Chan District	10 kW
Thai PBS	E27	Doi Pui, Mueang District	10 kW

== Lampang ==
Station	Channel	Location	ERP Power
Channel 5	E4	Khao Phrabat, Tambon Phrabat, Mueang District	10 kW
Channel 3	E6	Doi Ton, Mueang District	10 kW
Channel 11 NBT	E8	Doi Phrabat, Mueang District	10 kW
Channel 9	E10	Doi Ton, Mueang District	10 kW
Channel 7	E12	Khao Phrabat, Tambon Phrabat, Mueang District	10 kW
Thai PBS	E29	Doi Ton, Mueang District	10 kW

== Khon Kaen ==
Station	Channel	Location	ERP Power
Channel 7	E5	Unknown or Khao Suan Khuang	10 kW
Channel 3	E7	Tambon Khok Si, Mueang District	10 kW
Channel 9	E9	Tambon Khok Si, Mueang District	10 kW
Channel 5	E11	Khao Suan Khuang	10 kW
Channel 11 NBT	E26	Mo Din Daeng	20 kW
Thai PBS	E29	Ban Phrom Nimit	10 kW

== Nakhon Ratchasima ==
Station	Channel	Location	ERP Power
Channel 11 NBT	E6	Khao Yai Thiang	10 kW
Channel 5	E8	Khao Yai Thiang	10 kW
Channel 9	E10	Khao Yai Thiang	10 kW
Channel 7	E12	Khao Yai Thiang	10 kW
Thai PBS	E27	Ban Nong Pet Nam, Mueang District	10 kW
Channel 3	E41	Khao Yai Thiang	10 kW

== Phuket ==
Station	Channel	Location	ERP Power
Channel 5	E3	Khao Tosae, Mueang District	10 kW
Channel 11 NBT	E5	Khao Tosae, Mueang District	10 kW
Channel 7	E7	Khao Tosae, Mueang District	10 kW
Channel 9	E9	Khao Tosae, Tambon Ratda, Mueang District	5 kW
Channel 3	E11	Khao Tosae, Tambon Ratda, Mueang District	5 kW
Thai PBS	E27	Khao Tosae, Mueang District	5 kW
