= Siam Commercial Bank =

Thai bank

The Siam Commercial Bank ธนาคารไทยพาณิชย์
- Type: Public
- Traded as: SET: SCB
- Founded: October 4, 1904; 122 years ago (unofficial); January 30, 1907; 119 years ago (official)
- Founder: Prince Jayanta Mongkol; King Rama V
- Headquarters: SCB Park Plaza, Chatuchak, Bangkok, Thailand
- Key people: Kris Chantanotoke (Director & Chief Executive Officer)
- Revenue: ▲168,620 million baht (2018)
- Net income: ▼40,068 million baht (2018)
- Total assets: ▲3,187,340 million baht (2018)
- Total equity: ▲380,027 million baht (2018)
- Number of employees: 27,000
- Parent: SCB X Public Company Limited www.SCBX.com
- Subsidiaries: SCB Asset Management; SCB Protect; SCB Julius Baer; SCB Plus
- Website: www.scb.co.th

Siam Commercial Bank (Thai: ธนาคารไทยพาณิชย์; RTGS: Thanakhan Thai Phanit; SCB), founded as Book Club, officially Siam Commercial Bank Public Company Limited, is the first and the oldest Thai bank. It was founded on 30 January 1907 by the appointment of Chulalongkorn.

== History ==
SCB was founded as the Book Club on 4 October 1904 by Prince Jayanta Mongkoll, a brother of King Chulalongkorn (Rama V), who was convinced that the time was ripe for Siam to have its own banking system to help foster the country's economic development, rather than rely on foreign banks operating branches in the country. The name "Book Club" was chosen in an effort to keep the project sub rosa as it was something of an experiment. After the success of the Book Club, King Chulalongkorn granted royal approval for it to officially operate as a commercial bank under the name "Siam Commercial Bank" on 30 January 1907.

SCB opened its headquarters in Bangkok's Talat Noi District in 1910. In 1911, it was granted approval to display the royal Garuda symbol as a royal warrant by King Vajiravudh (Rama VI).

As of May 2024, Siam Commercial Bank has 643 domestic branches and over 10,000 ATMs around the country.

== Milestones ==
- 1939: SCB changed its name to "Siam Commercial Bank" in English, and "Thanakarn Thai Panich" in Thai.
- 1983: SCB introduced Thailand's first automated teller machines and established the Thai Bank Museum.
- 1993: SCB registered as a public company and was henceforth known as "The Siam Commercial Bank Public Company Limited".
- 1996: SCB moved its headquarters to SCB Park Plaza Ratchayothin.
- 2016: SCB introduced SCB E PASSBOOK, which is a bank account without a passbook. Customers are required to give their email address to the bank in order to receive a bank statement every month.
- 2017: SCB introduced a new version of mobile application called SCB Easy, including the cardless ATM feature for the first time in Thailand.
- 2018: SCB announced that any transactions done via mobile application would no longer be subject to transaction fees.

== Subsidiaries ==
- SCB Asset Management (SCBAM)
- SCB Protect
- SCB Julius Baer
- SCB Plus
- SCB 10X
- SCB TechX
- CardX
- InnovestX

== Management ==
As of 2023 the managers of the bank are:

- Vichit Suraphongchai, Chairman of the Board and Chairman of the Corporate Social Responsibility Committee
- Arthid Nanthawithaya, Director, Member of the Executive Committee and Member of the Technology Committee
- Kris Chantanotoke, Director and Chief Executive Officer
