= Phra Pin-klao Bridge =

Phra Pinklao Bridge สะพานสมเด็จพระปิ่นเกล้า
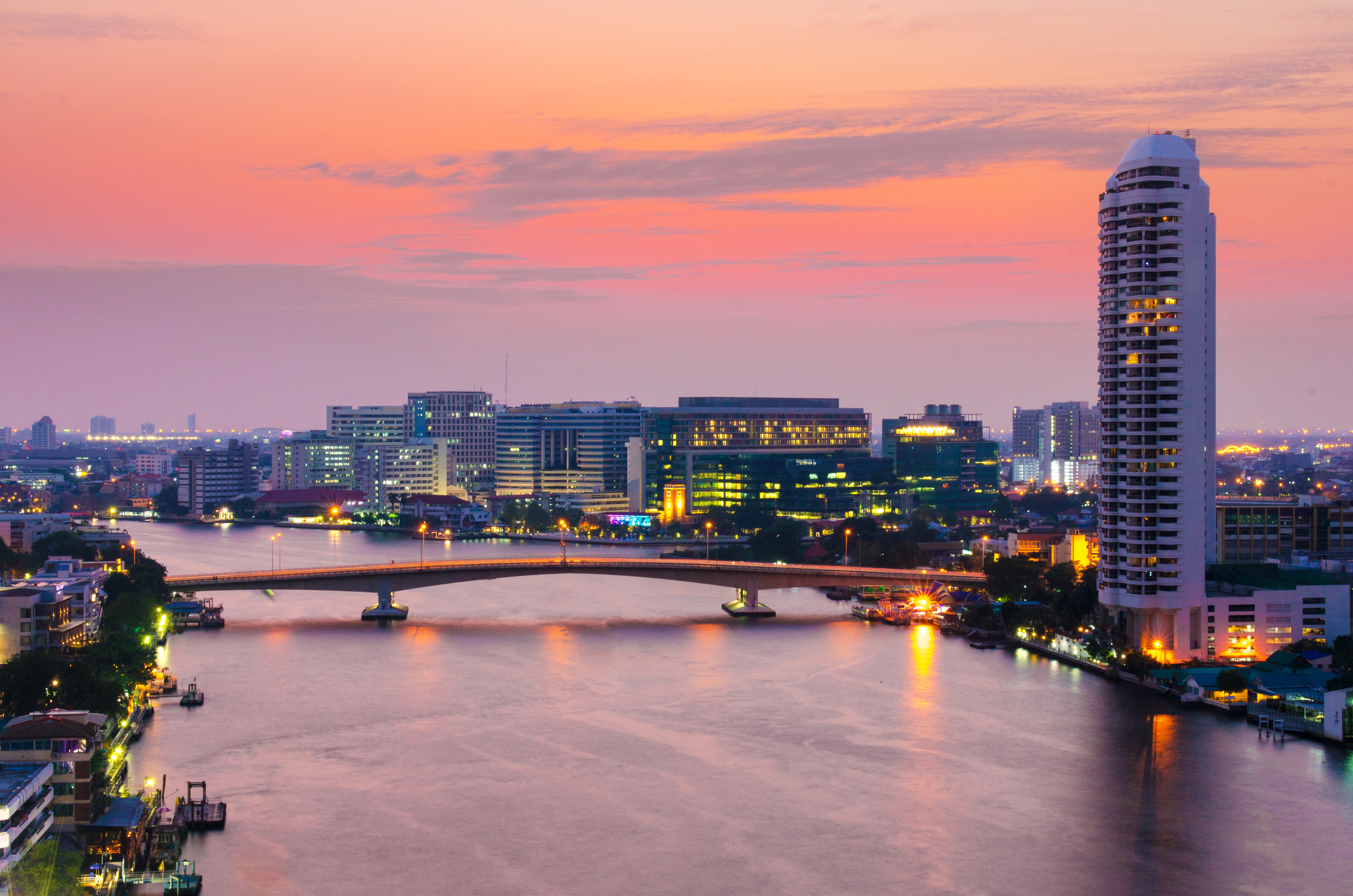
- Coordinates: 13°45′43″N 100°29′28″E
- Carries: 6 lanes of roadway, pedestrians
- Crosses: Chao Phraya River
- Locale: Bangkok, Thailand
- Official name: Somdet Phra Pinklao Bridge
- Other name(s): Phra Pinklao Bridge; Pinklao Bridge
- Preceded by: Rama VIII Bridge
- Followed by: Memorial Bridge

Characteristics
- Total length: 658 m
- Longest span: 110 m
- Clearance below: 11.5 m

History
- Opened: 24 September 1973

Location
- Interactive map of Phra Pinklao Bridge

The Somdet Phra Pinklao Bridge (Thai: สะพานสมเด็จพระปิ่นเกล้า, RTGS: Saphan Somdet Phra Pinklao, pronounced [sā.pʰāːn sǒm.dèt pʰráʔ pìn.klâːw], usually known simply as Pinklao Bridge) is a bridge near the Grand Palace over the Chao Phraya River in Bangkok, Thailand. It links Rattanakosin Island with Thonburi.

== Background ==
The bridge is named after Pinklao, vice-king of Siam, 1851–1866. During its construction, the bridge was referred to as the Tha Chang Wang Na Bridge (Thai: สะพานท่าช้างวังหน้า). In June 1973, it was renamed the Somdej Phra Pinklao Bridge in honour of Prince Pinklao.

The Chalerm Sawan 58 Bridge (Thai: สะพานเฉลิมสวรรค์ ๕๘) along two pedestrian bridges crossing the northern part of Khlong Khu Mueang Doem (Thai: คลองคูเมืองเดิม) had to be dismantled to make way for the new bridge and its access road.

Construction of the bridge started on 4 August 1971. It was opened to traffic on 24 September 1973 by Prime Minister Thanom Kittikachorn. The bridge was built jointly by Obayashi Gumi Ltd. and Sumitomo Construction Co. Ltd under the supervision of Swiss Engineering Project (SEP) which acted as trustee for the Department of Public and Municipal Works (DPMW).

The main drivers behind the construction of the bridge were:

- To alleviate the traffic congestion over and around the Memorial Bridge and to shorten travel time and cut costs
- To foster inter-city relations between Bangkok and Thonburi
- To facilitate the development in the vicinity of the bridge

The Sa-nga Phanit Co., Ltd. (Thai: บริษัท สง่าพานิช จำกัด) was the main contractor for the Phan Phiphop Lila Bridge (Thai: สะพานผ่านพิภพลีลา) extension over Khlong Khu Mueang Doem (Thai: คลองคูเมืองเดิม)^{[a]} to match the new bridge system at a cost of 6,880,000 baht.

It is feared that the heavy traffic crossing Pinklao Bridge could cause structural damage to the old buildings on Ratchadamnoen Avenue. Some residents expressed their desire in 2010 to have the bridge dismantled mainly due to the air and noise pollution it brings to the old district of Bangkok. The Cheonggyecheon project in Seoul is given as an example of the positive effects the dismantlement could have.

== Water transport ==
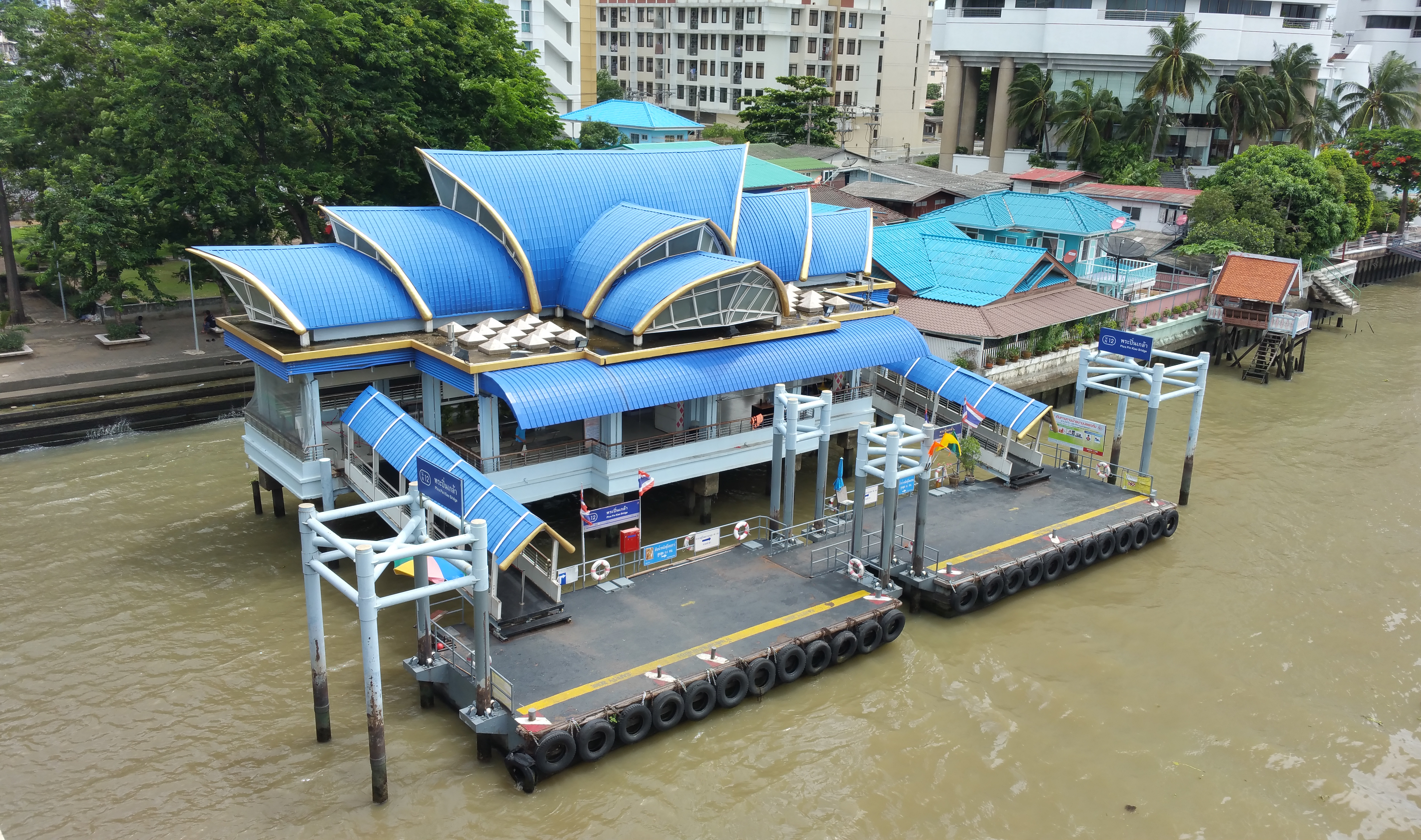
Phra Pin Klao Bridge Pier as seen from the bridge

At the Thonburi side of the bridge, the pier serving the Phra Pin Klao Bridge (designated N12) for the Chao Phraya Express Boat was temporarily closed for renovation in 2024. During this period, boats had to stop at a nearby alternative pier located near a mu kratha restaurant. The pier reopened for service on July 3, 2024, at exactly 1:00 PM after the renovation was completed.

== Notes ==
^{a} The northern part of "Khlong Khu Mueang Doem" was formerly known as "Khlong Rongmai" (คลองโรงไหม). "Khlong Khu Mueang Doem" is also called popularly "Khlong Lord" (คลองหลอด).
