= Engineering, procurement, and construction =

Type of turnkey project

Engineering, procurement, and construction (EPC) contracts (a type of turnkey contract) are a form of contract used to undertake construction works by the private sector on large-scale and complex infrastructure projects. They may follow a Front-End Engineering and Design (FEED) contract.

== Overview ==
Under an EPC contract, a contractor is obliged to deliver a complete facility to a developer who needs only "turn a key" to start operating the facility; hence EPC contracts are sometimes called turnkey construction contracts. In addition to delivering a complete facility, the contractor must deliver that facility for a guaranteed price by a fixed date and it must perform to the specified level. Failure to comply with any requirement will usually result in the contractor incurring monetary liabilities. The EPC contractor coordinates all design, procurement and construction work and ensures that the whole project is completed as required and in time. They may or may not undertake actual site work. EPC companies are often used in large-scale projects, such as power plants, refineries, chemical processing facilities, infrastructure projects, and more. Clients turn to EPC companies because they offer a one-stop solution for the entire project lifecycle, streamlining the process and reducing the complexity of managing multiple contractors and suppliers. These firms play a crucial role in delivering complex projects on time and within budget.

Various abbreviations used for this type of contract are LSTK for lump sum turn key, EPIC for engineering, procurement, installation & commissioning and EPCC for engineering, procurement, construction and commissioning. Use of EPIC is common, e.g., by FIDIC and most Persian Gulf countries. Use of LSTK is common in the Kingdom of Saudi Arabia. Use of EPCC is common in Qatar and some other countries.

== Functions ==
EPC contracts cover the following issues.

Engineering functions

- Basic engineering
- Detailed engineering
- Planning
- Construction engineering

Procurement functions

- Logistics and transport
- Receiving
- Procurement
- Invoicing
- Purchasing

Construction functions

- Electrical installation
- Mechanical erection
- Civil engineering

Commissioning functions

- After-sales-service
- Testing and commissioning
- Modernization of plants

An EPC, LSTK, or EPCC all are the same types of contracts. This form of contract is covered by the FIDIC (International Federation of Consulting Engineers) Silver Book containing the title words EPC/turnkey. The initials EPCM are also encountered frequently on international projects, but this is very different from EPC. EPCM is a services-only contract, under which the contractor performs engineering, procurement and construction management services. In an EPCM arrangement, the client selects a contractor who provides management services for the whole project on behalf of the client.

== See also ==
- EPCI
- Construction management

== Bibliography ==
- Hartman, Francis T. (2003). The Ten Commandments of Better Contracting: A Practical Guide to Adding Value to an Enterprise Through More Effective Smart Contracting. ASCE Publications. pp. 69–71. ISBN 978-0784470985.
