= Phyathai Hospitals Group =

Hospital network in Bangkok, Thailand

- โรงพยาบาลพญาไท
- Services: Hospital

The Phyathai Hospitals Group is a hospital group based in Bangkok, Thailand, and founded in 1976.

The group consists of Phyathai 1 Hospital, Phyathai 2 Hospital, and Phyathai 3 Hospital. Phyathai 1 and Phyathai 2 hospitals are located in the city center of Bangkok, while Phyathai 3 hospital is located in Thonburi.

== Accreditations and recognition ==
The group is equipped with medical equipment and technology by the Dutch provider Philips. It provides service for international patients and tourists, and provides interpreters, international wards, and free consultation and medical advice over the internet.

Phyathai 2 Hospital received JCI accreditation in 2014.

== Hospitals ==
=== Phyathai 1 hospital ===
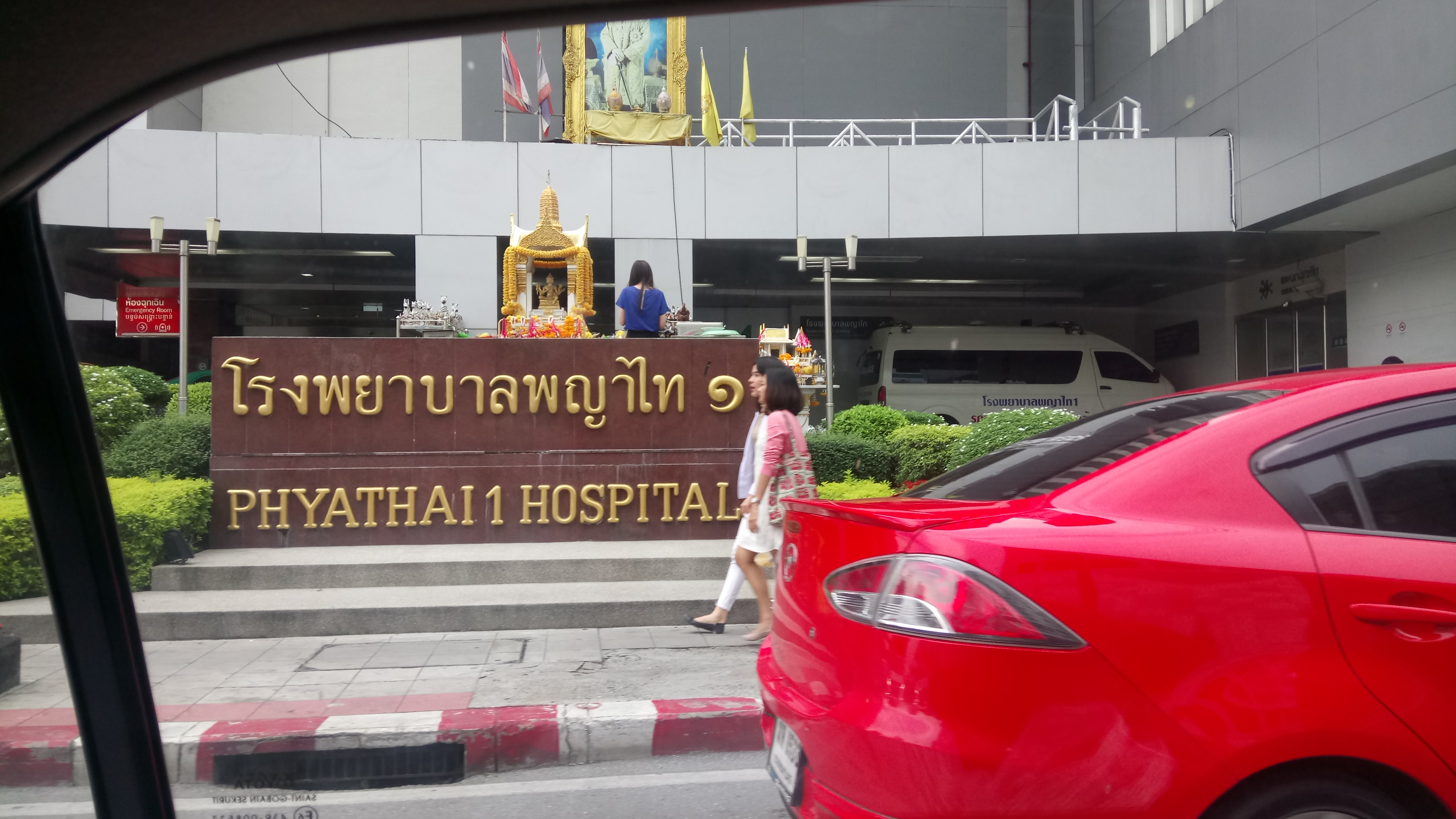
in front of Phyathai 1 Hospital

Phyathai 1 Hospital is a private hospital on Si Ayutthaya Road, Ratchathewi District, Bangkok, not far from Ratchaprarop Station (Airport Rail Link). It was established on 30 July 1976 and specializes in neurosurgery.

Coordinates: 13.758893°N 100.539255°E

=== Phyathai 2 International Hospital ===
Phyathai 2 Hospital is a private hospital in Bangkok, Thailand. It is on Phahon Yothin Road in Phaya Thai District, not far from Sanam Pao BTS Station. It was opened on 22 July 1987.

The hospital is composed of two buildings and covers an area of 11,204 square meters. It has 550 beds and 76 diagnostic rooms. It has outpatient capacity of 2,000 daily.

Phyathai 2 Hospital received JCI accreditation in 2014.

Coordinates: 13.772898°N 100.540114°E

=== Phyathai 3 Hospital ===
Phyathai 3 Hospital is a hospital in Bangkok, Thailand, not far from Bang Wa BTS station. It established on 4 October 1996. It mainly serves patients from the Thonburi side. Healthcare provided includes fertility treatment and mother and baby support.

Coordinates: 13.725877°N 100.463896°E

== See also ==
- Hospital accreditation
- Bangkok Dusit Medical Services
