= BNH Hospital =

Hospital in Bangkok, Thailand

Coordinates: 13.7247°N 100.5342°E

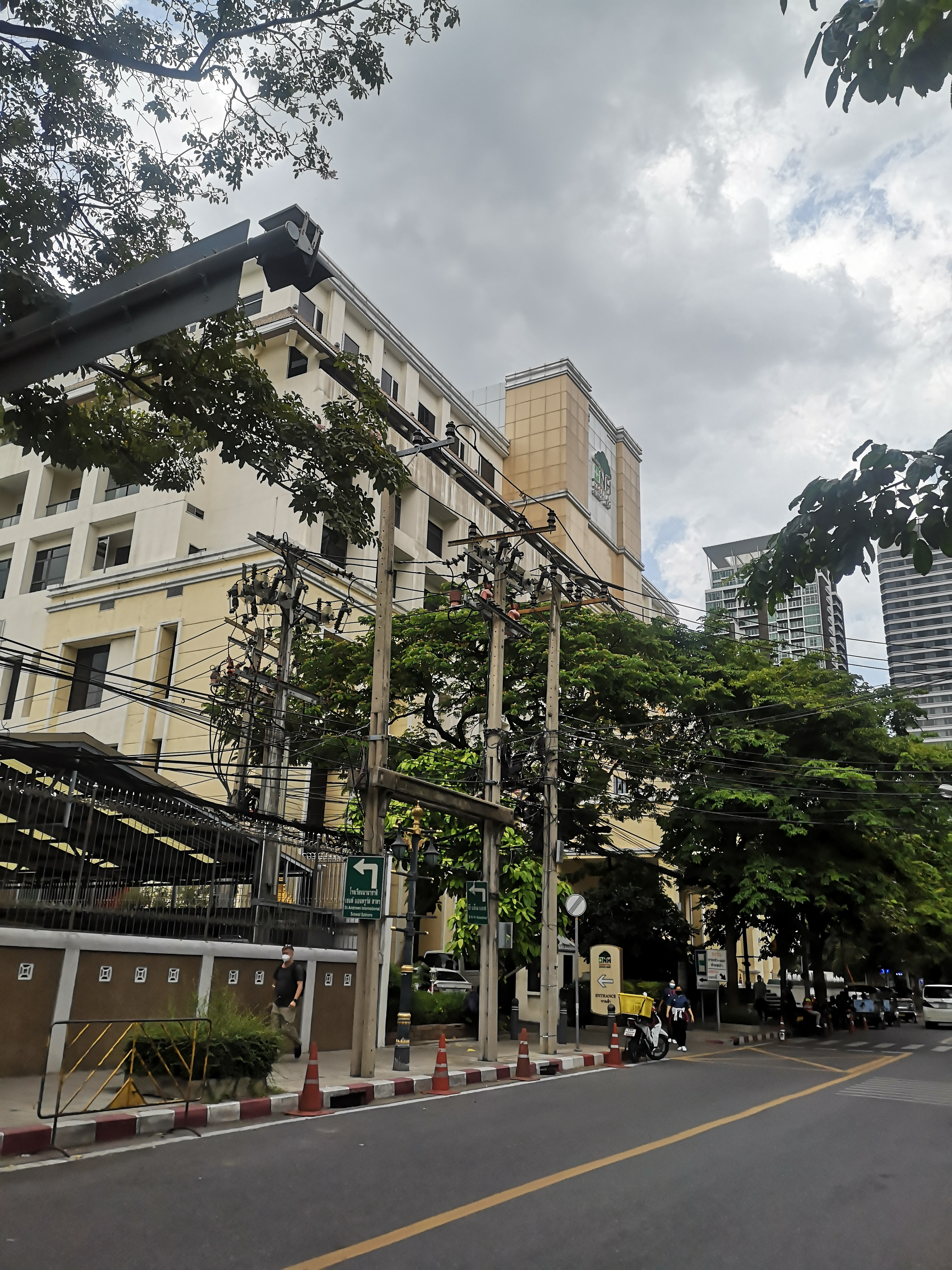
BNH Hospital

BNH Hospital, formerly the Bangkok Nursing Home, is a hospital located in Bangkok, Thailand.

== History ==
=== Origins ===
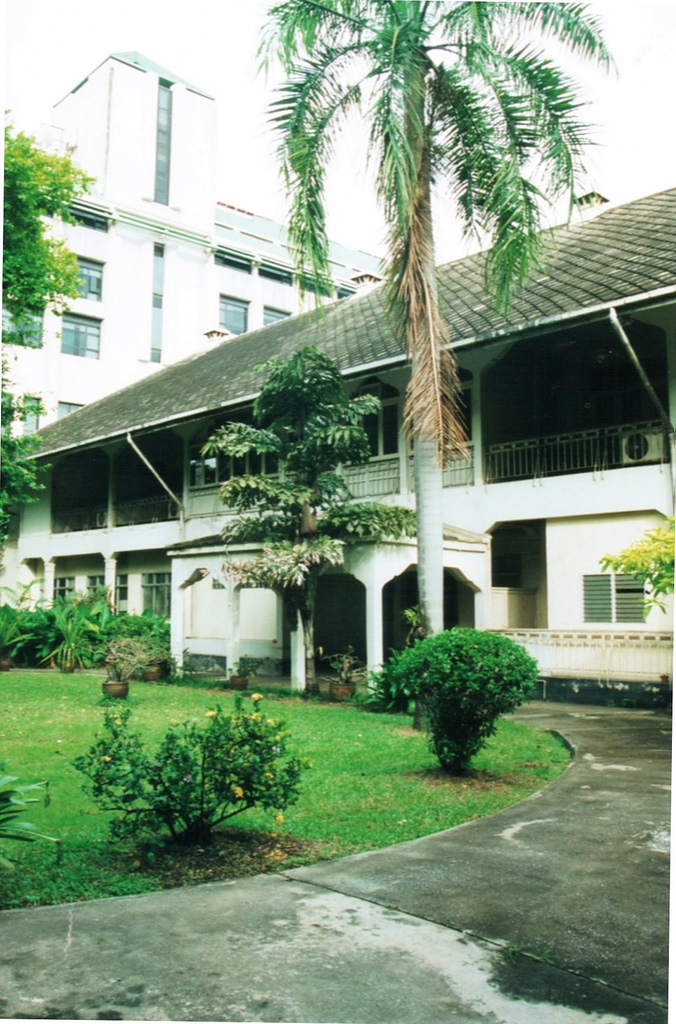
Bangkok Nursing Home original buildings

In the latter years of the 19th century, health care in Bangkok was rudimentary and based on traditional Chinese and Thai medicine. However, Bangkok was growing as a base for British and other foreign companies and an increasing numbers of expatriate employees who demanded familiar western-style healthcare. Western-style clinics and hospitals were unknown and doctors trained in contemporary western medicine were exceptional by their absence.

On 20 August 1897, Bangkok's British community met at the British Legation with George Grenville, the resident British Minister and Consul General; this group proposed the establishment of a hospital modeled on contemporary British practice. Their decision was proposed to King Chulalongkorn, who endorsed it and instructed the Ministry of Education to supervise the establishment of a nursing home exclusively for the care of Bangkok's foreign residents.

The king stipulated that the nursing home should be a non-profit organisation and provided an annual grant of 960 baht.

In 1898, two British nurses, Matron Cawley and the hospital's first nursing sister, Miss Hitchens, arrived from the UK, and by August, the hospital was ready to receive its first patients.

Its first home was in located in temporary rented accommodation near its present location. In the first few years, the hospital faced financial difficulties that occasionally prevented it from paying its employees.

In 1899, the Siamese economy faced a crisis of confidence resulting in an economic slump, making the hospital's precarious financial situation more insecure. But in the years between its opening and the financial crisis, the Bangkok Nursing Home had proved its value to the expatriate community. As a result, it was clear that it had become a resource that was too valuable to lose.

However, the haemorrhaging of funds was not easily stemmed, so in April 1901, another meeting was held at the Court House of the British Legation. The original founding group was wound up and a new association was established in September of that year, under the wing of a certain Mr. Halliday who took over the assets of 2000 baht. Mr. Halliday also had the responsibility of paying the nurses' salaries.

Later in 1901, the Bangkok Nursing Home Association raised a loan of 50,000 baht and purchased a plot of land in Convent Road from the Crown Property Office. Just twelve months later, a new hospital, built at a cost of 31,762 baht, was opened.

Teresa Lightwood contributed to the maternity services in Siam in the 1940s. This is documented in the book Teresa of Siam, published by Cassell in 1960.

=== Development ===
With an average load of only 50 patients each year between 1902 and 1912, it cannot be said that the nursing staff were overworked. But from this small base, the hospital's fortune and revenues grew steadily to such a point, that in 1912, a new wing was built. The new building was funded partly by public subscription and by a 500 baht donation from King Vajiravudh. The King Chulalongkorn Wing housed an operating theatre and a maternity ward, and was opened by King Vajiravudh on 23 July 1912.

Just four years later, further expansion was necessary, and an 8,000 baht gift from the king facilitated further expansion. By 1922, the Bangkok Nursing Home's services were in such demand that it was necessary to build a new hospital.

At the time, money was still tight and the required funds were not readily available. The governing Committee examined a number of funding methods including public subscriptions and a lottery; a combination of a lottery and public subscriptions were considered the best means of raising funds.

The ambassadors of Denmark, the Netherlands, the United States and the United Kingdom agreed to become patrons of the hospital. The king received a deputation and gave consent for the establishment of a lottery.

The lottery raised 89,354 baht and public subscriptions of 40,000 baht, allowing the Nursing Home to buy land for its new building, which opened thirty years after the founding of the original hospital.

In the late 1980s, the BNH was again stretched to its limit and in need of expansion. With its historical association with the Thai monarchy, the management committee approached the Crown Property Bureau to become a partner in the building of a new international standard hospital. On 14 February 1996, the new Bangkok Nursing Home was opened and a few years later it re-branded itself as the BNH Hospital.

== Present status ==
Because of its roots in the British community and more importantly, as it was established as a charitable non-profit institution, the BNH still values its role as a contributor to the well being of the people of Bangkok. To this end, it organises a major semi-annual fundraising event in the form of a 'bed push'. Over the two years since the first bed push, the BNH Hospital has raised over two million baht for a children's charity.
