= Chaturaphak Rangsarit Bridge =

Bridge in Bangkok, Thailand

- Coordinates: 13°45′23.74″N 100°30′57.89″E
- Carries: Lan Luang Road
- Crosses: Khlong Phadung Krung Kasem
- Locale: Bangkok
- Official name: Chaturaphak Rangsarit Bridge
- Other name(s): Saphan Khao
- Maintained by: Bangkok Metropolitan Administration (BMA)

History
- Opened: 1904

Chaturaphak Rangsarit Bridge, also written as Jaturapak Rangsarit, (Thai: สะพานจตุรภักตร์รังสฤษดิ์, RTGS: Saphan Chaturaphak Rangsarit, pronounced [sa.pʰaːn t͡ɕà.tù.rá.pʰák rāŋ.sà.rìt]) is a historic bridge in Bangkok. This bridge crosses Khlong Phadung Krung Kasem at Lan Luang Road and is commonly called Saphan Khao (สะพานขาว, lit. 'white bridge') due to its colour. It is located at a tripoint between Khlong Maha Nak and Wat Sommanat Sub-districts (Pom Prap Sattru Phai District) and Si Yaek Maha Nak Sub-district (Dusit District).

King Chulalongkorn (Rama V) ordered the Department of Public Works to build it in 1903; the construction was completed in 1904. The King named it "Chaturaphak Rangsarit Bridge", "Chaturaphak" refers to Phra Phrom (the Thai perception of Brahma a supreme Hindu god with four faces). The bridge was later rebuilt with concrete in 1953, featuring plain concrete handrails and a nameplate in the centre. Each of the four corners has a single light pole. Two more similar bridges were added later to accommodate increased traffic.

This is one of five bridges over Khlong Phadung Krung Kasem with names that mean "created by the gods" (Thewet Narumit Bridge, Wisukam Narueman Bridge, Makkhawan Rangsan Bridge, Thewakam Rangrak Bridge, and Chaturaphak Rangsarit Bridge).

Chaturaphak Rangsarit Bridge stands at the end of the Bobae clothing market, near the Ministry of Social Development and Human Security. On the opposite side of the canal is Maha Nak Market (also known as Saphan Khao Market), the largest wholesale fruit market in Bangkok, making the area commonly known as the Maha Nak district.
