= Lan Luang Road =

Road in Bangkok, Thailand

Coordinates: 13.757121°N 100.513272°E

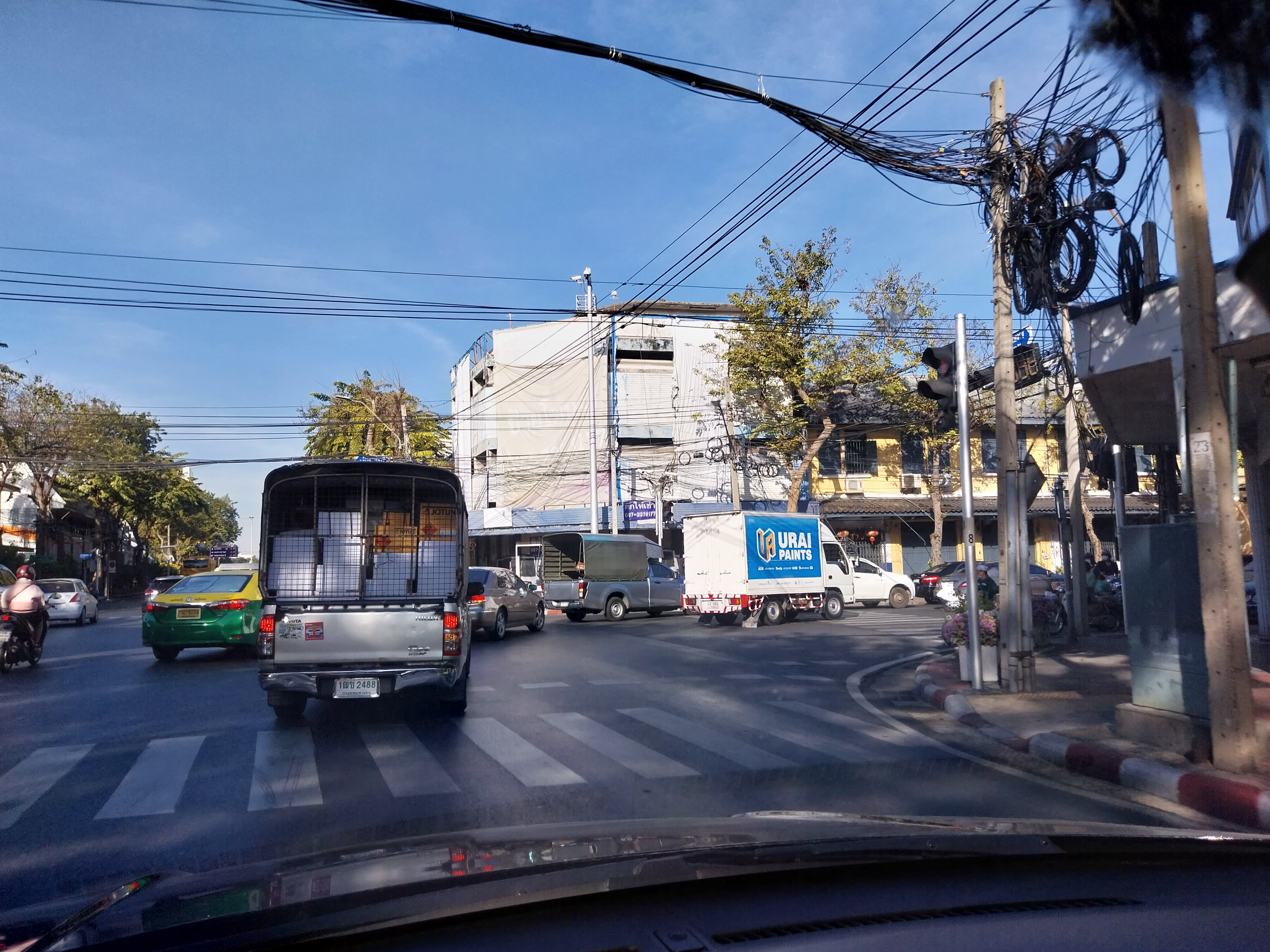
Lan Luang Intersection where it cuts across Chakkraphatdi Phong Road

Lan Luang Road (Thai: ถนนหลานหลวง, RTGS: Thanon Lan Luang, pronounced [tʰā.nǒn lǎːn lǔaŋ]; sometimes Larn Luang) is a road in Bangkok, it runs in a short distance of just about 1.5 km (1,500 ft).

The road starts at Phan Fa Lilat Bridge straight to the east, cut across Krung Kasem Road and crossed canal Khlong Phadung Krung Kasem to meet three other roads Phitsanulok, Phetchaburi and Sawan Khalok at the Yommarat Intersection, where the Yommarat Railway Halt situated.

It was built in the reign of King Chulalongkorn (Rama V), about in the year 1903. The King named it Lan Luang, which means "royal nephew", because it runs through the palaces of the six princes (all of them were sons of Prince Chaturonrasmi, the King's younger brother). While the bridge across Khlong Phadung Krung Kasem was named the King, Chaturaphak Rangsarit.

Previously, the area the road passed through was considered a suburb and was used as a place to raise royal buffalo. Hence, the road was unofficially known as Sanam Khwai Road or Sanam Krabue Road, meaning "buffalo field road".

From the beginning of the road up to Chaturaphak Rangsarit Bridge, it also serves as the boundary between Wat Sommanat Subdistrict (north side) and Khlong Maha Nak Subdistrict (south side), both in Pom Prap Sattru Phai District. After crossing Khlong Phadung Krung Kasem, it enters Si Yaek Maha Nak Subdistrict in Dusit District, and finally ends at Yommarat Intersection in Suan Chitlada Subdistrict.

The intersection with Chakkraphatdi Phong Road is known as Lan Luang Intersection. Around 1957, the Lan Luang neighbourhood encompassed the area around Wat Sitaram and Damrong Rak Road. It was known as a centre of modern entertainment and a hub for performance troupes such as lakhon chatri, likay, piphat, lamtat, and khon. Several theatre agencies were also based here.

Renowned buildings along the road include Thai Airways Contact Center, Royal Princess Larn Luang Hotel, Varadis Palace, National Statistical Office (NSO), Maha Nak Market, Hall of Honour of The Prime Ministers & the National Council of Women of Thailand Under The Royal Patronage of Her Majesty The Queen (formerly Ban Managkasila), and Asia-Pacific International University: Bangkok Campus.
