= Makkhawan Rangsan Bridge =

Makkhawan Rangsan Bridge สะพานมัฆวานรังสรรค์
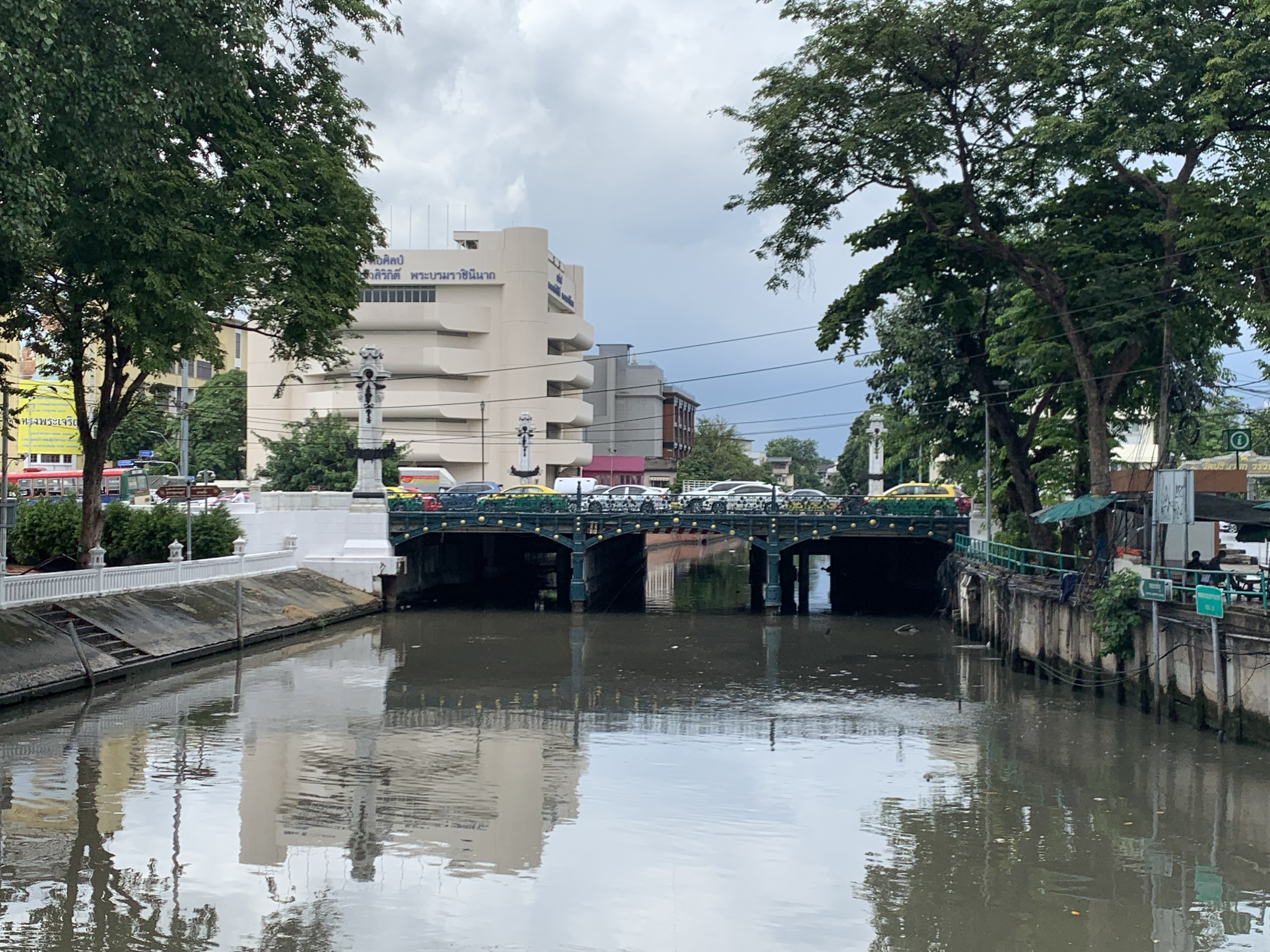
- The bridge in 2021
- Coordinates: 13°45′48.19″N 100°30′33.41″E
- Carries: Ratchadamnoen Avenue
- Crosses: Khlong Phadung Krung Kasem
- Locale: Bang Khun Phrom Sub-District, Phra Nakhon District and Wat Sommanat Sub-district, Pom Prap Sattru Phai District with Dusit Sub-District, Dusit District, Bangkok, Thailand
- Official name: Makkhawan Rangsan Bridge
- Other name: Makkhawan Bridge
- Maintained by: Bangkok Metropolitan Administration (BMA)

Characteristics
- Design: Italian and Spanish architectural styles
- Material: Steel and Marble

History
- Architect: Carlo Allegri
- Opened: 1903

Location
- Interactive map of Makkhawan Rangsan Bridge

Makkhawan Rangsan Bridge (Thai: สะพานมัฆวานรังสรรค์, RTGS: Saphan Makkhawan Rangsan, pronounced [sā.pʰāːn mák.kʰā.wāːn rāŋ.sǎn]; usually known simply as "Makkhawan Bridge") is a historic beam bridge located in inner Bangkok. It spans the canal Khlong Phadung Krung Kasem on Ratchadamnoen Avenue (outer section), at the tripoint where Bang Khun Phrom Sub-district (Phra Nakhon District), Wat Sommanat Sub-district (Pom Prap Sattru Phai District), and Dusit Sub-district (Dusit District) meet.

The bridge is situated near the United Nations offices in Thailand, Rajadamnern Boxing Stadium, Wat Sommanas Rajavaravihara, Wat Makutkasattriyaram, and Government House. It also serves as a four-way intersection connecting Ratchadamnoen, Krung Kasem, and Luk Luang Roads.

It is one of five bridges built across the Khlong Phadung Krung Kasem during the reign of King Chulalongkorn (Rama V). The bridge was designed by Italian architect Carlo Allegri, drawing from Italian and Spanish architectural styles, with Pont Alexandre III in Paris serving as a prototype. Construction took three years to complete.

The bridge features a striking Erawan (Airavata) steel frame and four marble lampposts, and it is regarded as one of the most beautiful bridges in Bangkok. It was inaugurated by His Majesty King Chulalongkorn on Sunday, November 1, 1903.

All five remaining bridges across the Khlong Phadung Krung Kasem were constructed during the same era, each bearing a name that rhymes and conveys the meaning "a bridge built by the deities". The name "Makkhawan Rangsan" translates to "the bridge created by Makkhawan (Indra)". King Chulalongkorn originally intended to name it "Makkhawan Rangrak" (มัฆวานรังรักษ์, RTGS: Makkhawan Rangrak, pronounced [mák.kʰá.waːn.raŋ.rák]).

In 1994, two additional bridge structures were added under a royal project initiated by King Bhumibol Adulyadej (Rama IX) to accommodate increased traffic.

Between 2010 and 2014, during a period of political unrest, the bridge served as a site for several political demonstrations, along with other landmarks on Ratchadamnoen Avenue, such as the Democracy Monument, Phan Fa Lilat Bridge, and Khok Wua Intersection.

== See also ==
- Wisukam Narueman Bridge
- Thewakam Rangrak Bridge
