= Charoen Rat 32 Bridge =

Charoen Rat 32 Bridge สะพานเจริญราษฎร์ ๓๒
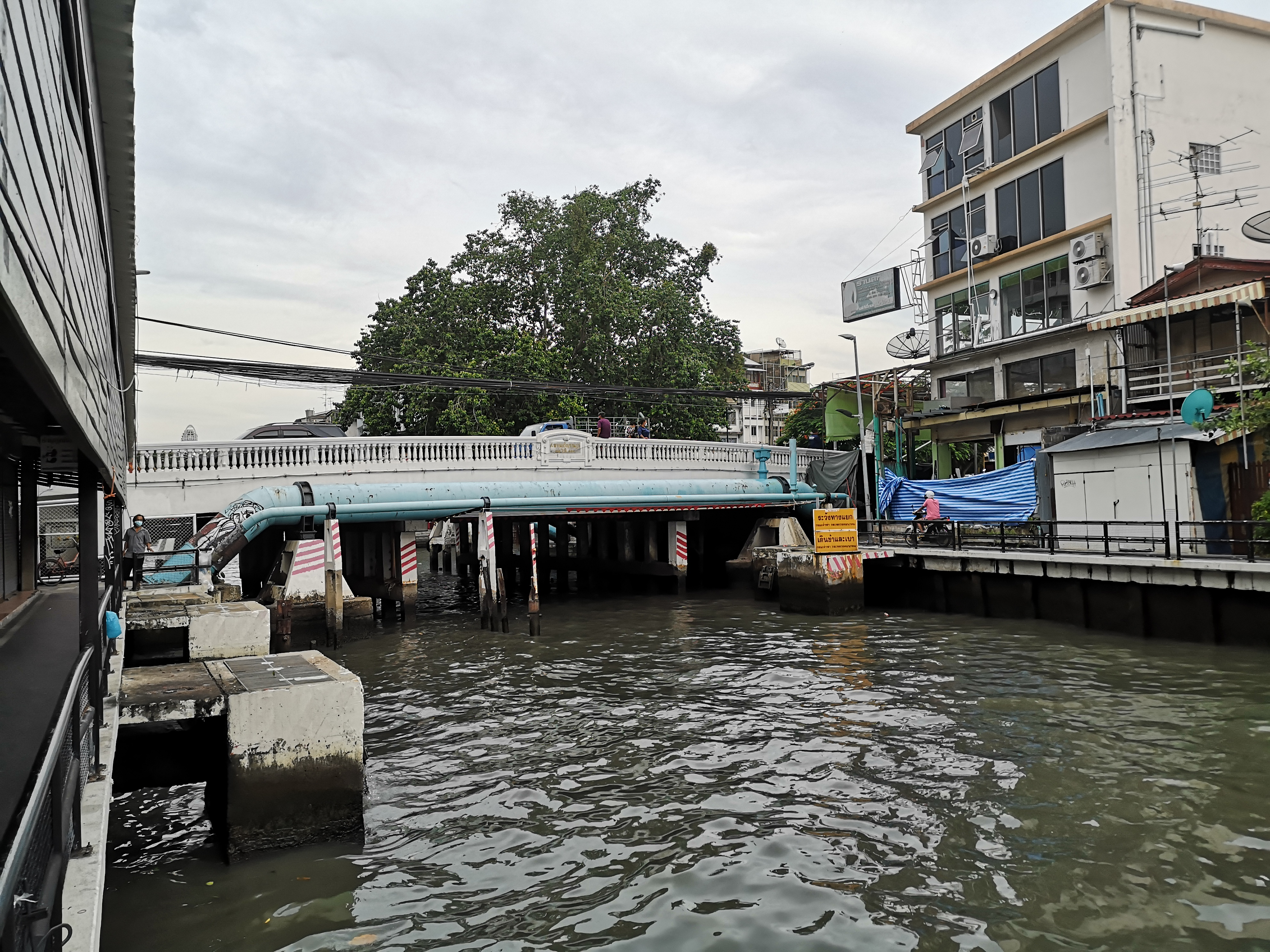
- Coordinates: 13°45′11.19″N 100°31′01.65″E
- Carries: Krung Kasem Road
- Crosses: Khlong Maha Nak
- Locale: Khlong Maha Nak Subdistrict, Pom Prap Sattru Phai District, Bangkok
- Official name: Charoen Rat 32 Bridge
- Other name(s): Maha Nak Bridge
- Maintained by: Bangkok Metropolitan Administration (BMA)

History
- Opened: December 31, 1912

Charoen Rat 32 Bridge (Thai: สะพานเจริญราษฎร์ ๓๒, RTGS: Saphan Charoen Rat Sam Sip Song) is a historic bridge goes over Khlong Maha Nak canal located where Khlong Maha Nak cuts across Khlong Phadung Krung Kasem in the area known as Bobae, a hub of cheap clothes in Bangkok. Past this point, Khlong Maha Nak becomes Khlong Saen Saep, the longest man made waterway in Thailand.

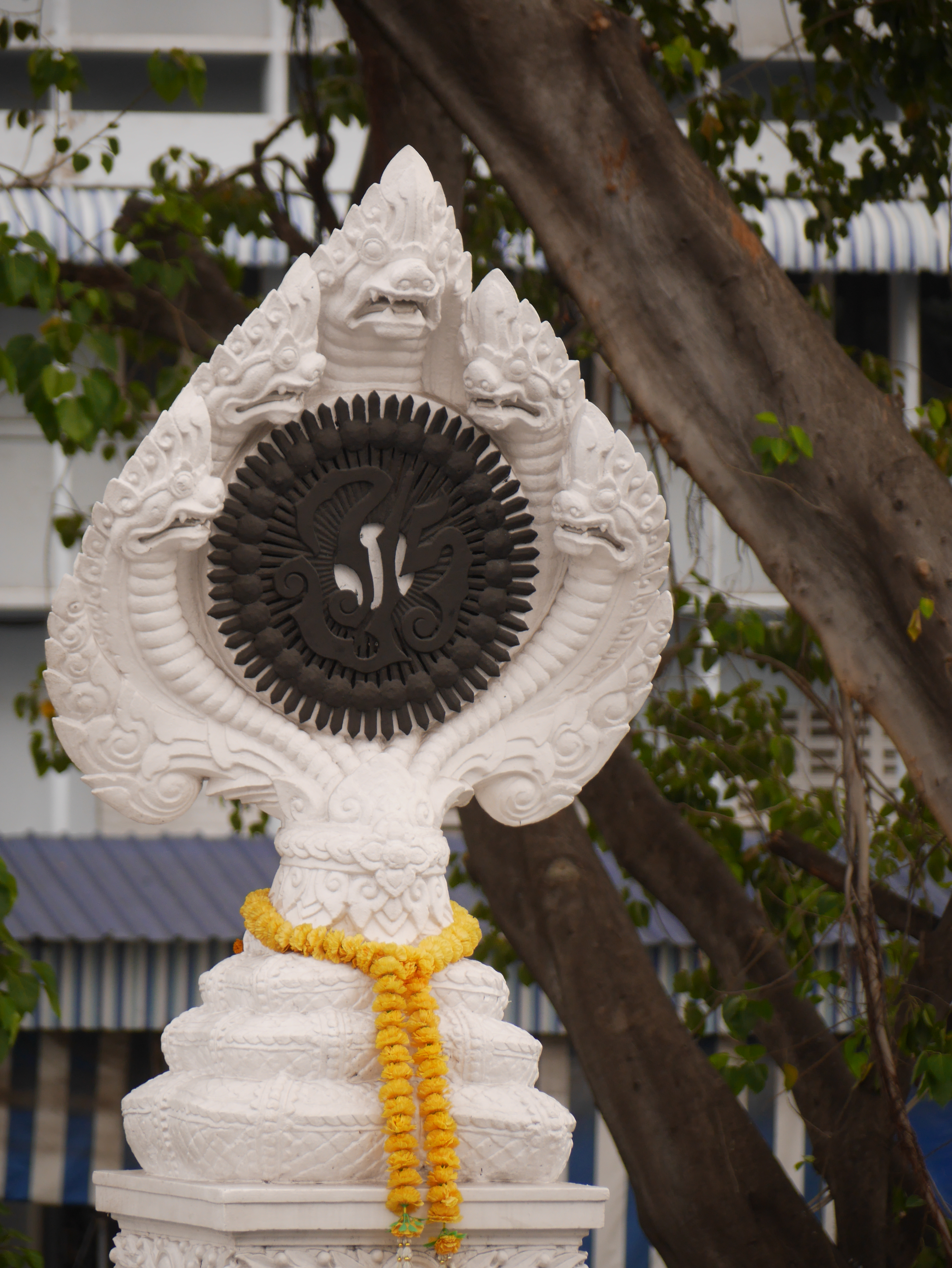
Five-headed naga sculpture

It was the second bridge in the "Charoen" bridge series (after Charoenrat 31 Bridge in Pak Khlong Talat area). They are bridges that King Rama VI built on the occasion of his birthday each year for public benefit.

Charoen Rat 32 Bridge has the five-headed Naga sculptures on each of its four corners. From here view of Wat Saket's Golden Mount, and the mustard-yellow and green roof of Masjid Mahanak, which stands out among half-timbered and concrete houses can see clearly. This Islamic house of worship and its surrounding communities are among Bangkok's oldest masjids and Muslim communities. These Muslim ancestors were among the laborers who helped dig Khlong Maha Nak and its continuation, Khlong Saen Saep, more than 200 years ago in the early Rattanakosin period.
