= Nang Loeng Market =

Market and historic neighbourhood in Bangkok

Coordinates: 13°45′34.88″N 100°30′43.67″E

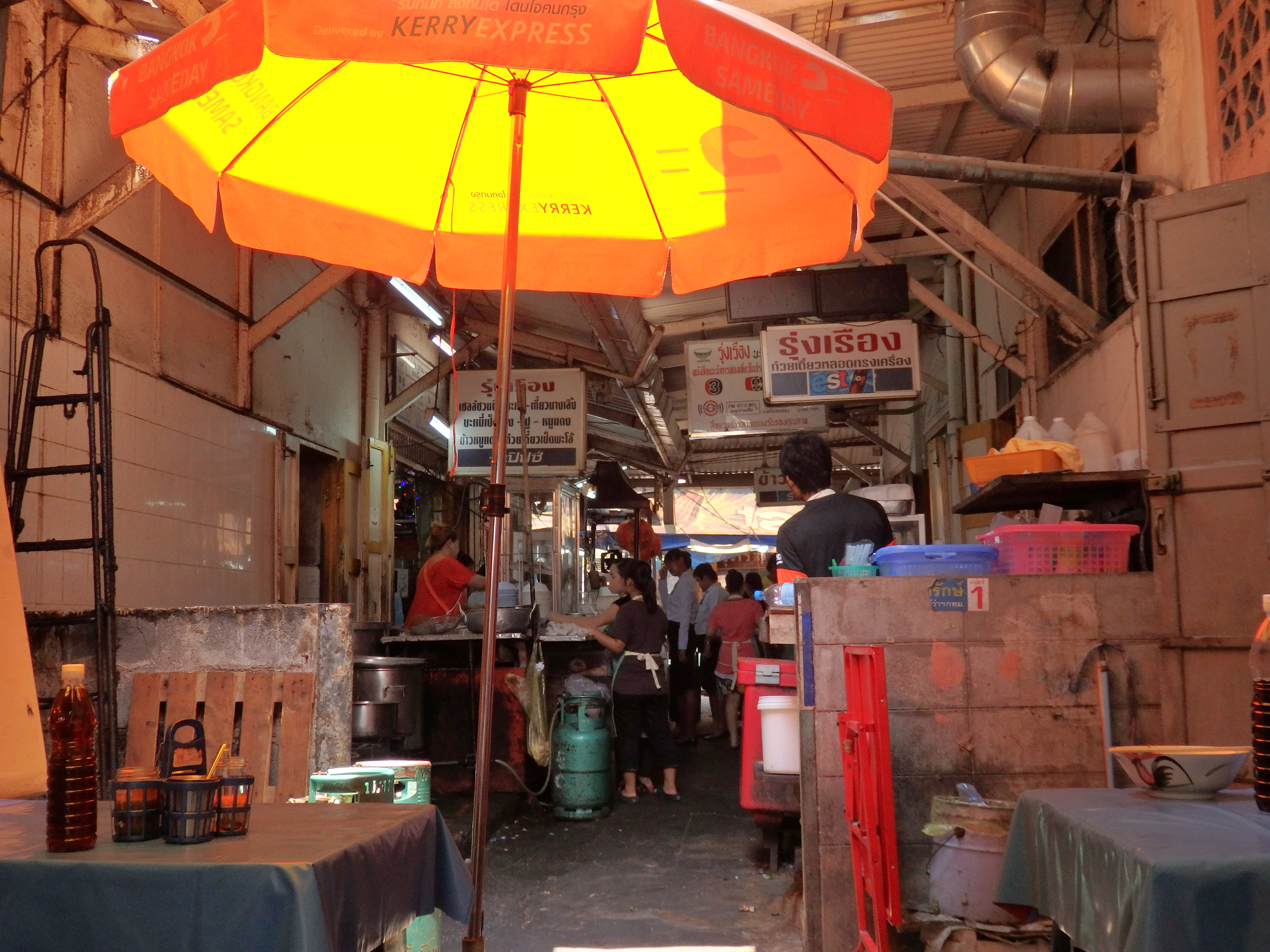
Atmosphere within the market

Nang Loeng Market, also known locally as Talat Nang Loeng or Talad Nang Loeng (Thai: ตลาดนางเลิ้ง, pronounced [tā.làːt nāːŋ lɤ́ːŋ]; lit: Nang Loeng market; also known as "Nang Loeng" (Note: "Nang Loeng" has also become the name of a neighborhood, referring to the area surrounding the market. It extends along Nakhon Sawan road all the way to Nang Loeng junction, a three-way intersection where Nakhon Sawan road meets Phitsanulok road. This area was once the site of the Royal Turf Club of Thailand, commonly known as Nang Loeng Racecourse (now King Rama IX Memorial Park), located in Suan Chitlada sub-district, Dusit district.)) is a historic market in Bangkok, located in Wat Sommanat sub-district, Pom Prap Sattru Phai district.

Talat Nang Loeng was built in the reign of King Rama V. The King officially opened on March 29, 1900 as the first land market of Thailand.

The name Nang Loeng comes from I Loeng (อีเลิ้ง, [ʔīː lɤ́ːŋ]), its one type of jar of the Mon people, this has been boat trading in the past around this area (Khlong Phadung Krung Kasem). Until the era of Field Marshal Plaek Phibunsongkhram was Prime Minister, so it was changed to Nang Loeng to sound more polite.

Originally, the area around Nang Loeng was called Ban Sanam Khwai (บ้านสนามควาย, [bâːn sā.nǎːm kʰwāːj]), which means "a place for raising buffaloes", owing it was a suburban area.

Today, around the Talat Nang Loeng is full of old shophouses built with beautiful colonial architecture. And in the market is also a traditional community, which have lived since the market launch. Notable for its food especially Thai desserts. And there's also old cinema (Sala Chaloem Thani; ศาลาเฉลิมธานี), the current closed down in 1993, which has now become a warehouse. In the middle of the market has a shrine of Prince Abhakara Kiartivongse that look like a Chinese joss house commanded the respect and worship of the locals. The reason to have the shrine here was because of the close relationship in the past with locals. His old residence was just opposite Khlong Phadung Krung Kasem not too far (present-day Rajamangala University of Technology Rattanakosin: Bangkok Commercial Campus and Bank of Agriculture and Agricultural Cooperatives).

== Nearby places ==
- Government House
- Royal Dusit Golf Club
- Thewakam Rangrak Bridge
- Wat Somanat Wihan
