= Wat Sitaram =

Buddhist temple in Bangkok, Thailand

- วัดสิตาราม (Thai)
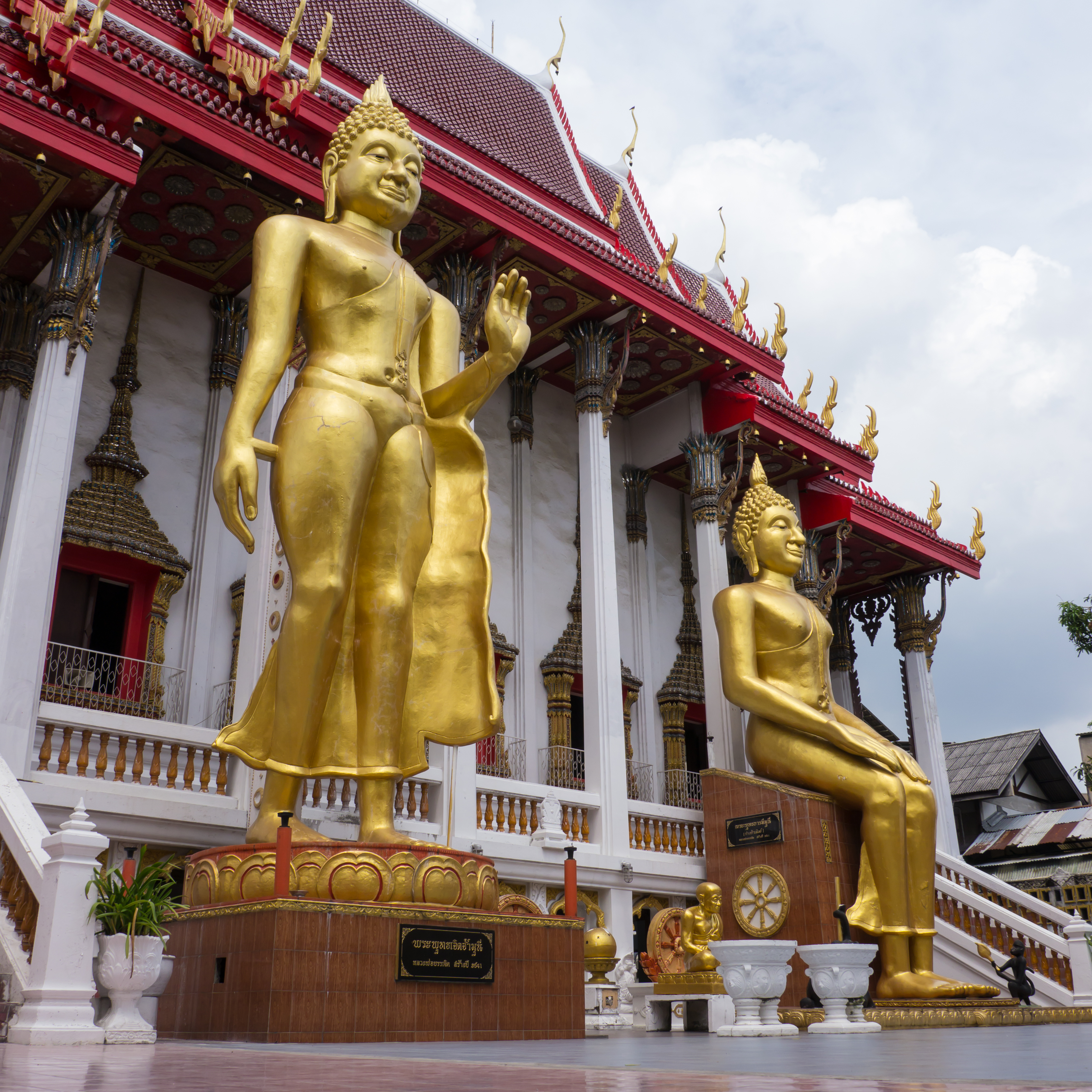
- Buddha images beside the ordination hall

- Location within Bangkok

Religion
- Affiliation: Theravada Buddhism

Location
- Location: 21 Damrong Rak Road, Khlong Maha Nak Subdistrict, Pom Prap Sattru Phai District, Bangkok
- Country: Thailand
- Interactive map of Wat Sitaram
- Coordinates: 13.75561°N 100.51036°E

Architecture
- Type: Thai Architecture
- Founder: Chao Krom Yim

Wat Sitaram (Thai: วัดสิตาราม) is a Thai monastery in Bangkok, located on the Damrong Rak Road near Khlong Maha Nak canal between Wat Saket and Bobae Market, considered to be the temple that is closest to Wat Saket, or temple of Golden Mount.

== Description ==
It is a civil temple, formerly name was Wat Khok Mu (วัดคอกหมู lit. 'pigsty temple'). It was told that during King Rama II's reign in early Rattanakosin period Chao Krom Yim (เจ้ากรมยิ้ม), who was a Mon (Peguan) persuaded the Chinese who mostly were pig raisers in the area to build a temple called Wat Khok Mu.

Later Vajirananavarorasa, supreme patriarch at that time has changed its name to Wat Sitaram. It derived from conversion of Pali language, from a word of Yim (the temple founder's name), and a word of aram (the temple, or monastery), ubosot (ordination hall) of the temple has Chinese styled rooftop covered by Thai styled tiles. The gables are decorated with floral design stuccos and Chinese glazed ceramics.
