= Yommarat Intersection =

Yommarat
- ยมราช
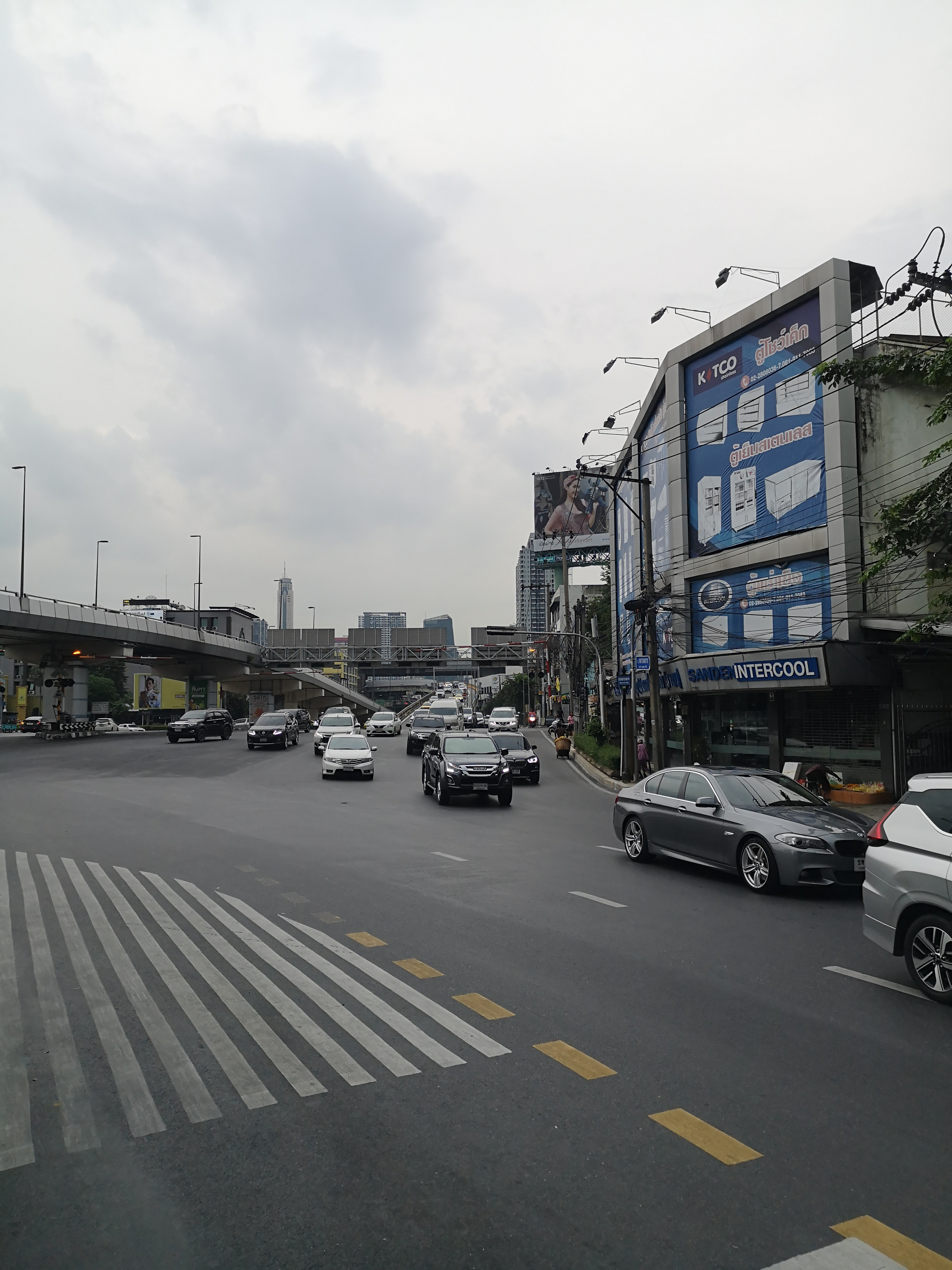
- Yommarat Intersection (as seen from Lan Luang Road)
- Interactive map of Yommarat

Location
- Suan Chitlada and Si Yaek Maha Nak, Dusit, Bangkok, Thailand
- Coordinates: 13°45′26.22″N 100°31′13.94″E
- Roads at junction: Sawankhalok (north); Phetchaburi (east); Lan Luang (southwest); Phitsanulok (south)

Construction
- Type: Four-way at-grade intersection

Yommarat (Thai: ยมราช, pronounced [jōm.râːt]) is a major crossroads in Bangkok, serving as the five-way intersection and starting point of Lan Luang Road, Phitsanulok Road, Sawankhalok Road, and Phetchaburi Road, with features an overpass spanning the intersection, on which motorcycles are prohibited. It lies on the southeastern edge of Dusit District, straddling the boundary between Suan Chitlada Subdistrict and Si Yaek Maha Nak Subdistrict. Continuing eastward along Phetchaburi Road leads to Uruphong Intersection.

The area also provides access to the Si Rat Expressway in the northbound direction, commonly referred to as the "Yommarat Expressway entry."

A railway line from Hua Lamphong railway station passes through the area. Nearby, along Sawankhalok Road, is the Yommarat railway halt, which is the first stop from Hua Lamphong.

Historically, the area was home to the Colosseum Cinema, a popular standalone movie theater during its peak years (c. 1962–1982). This period marked the golden age of standalone cinemas in Bangkok, alongside notable venues such as Kings, Queens, and Grand cinemas in Wang Burapha, as well as Sala Chaloem Thai on Ratchadamnoen Avenue. The Colosseum Cinema building has since been demolished, and no visible remains have survived for many years.
