= Ford Resource and Engagement Center Bangkok =

- Formation: 2019
- Headquarters: Pom Prap Sattru Phai, Bangkok, Thailand
- Website: fordfund.org/frecbangkok

The Ford Resource and Engagement Center Bangkok, also known as FREC Bangkok, is a hub for Thailand-based NGOs in partnership with the Ford Motor Company Fund.

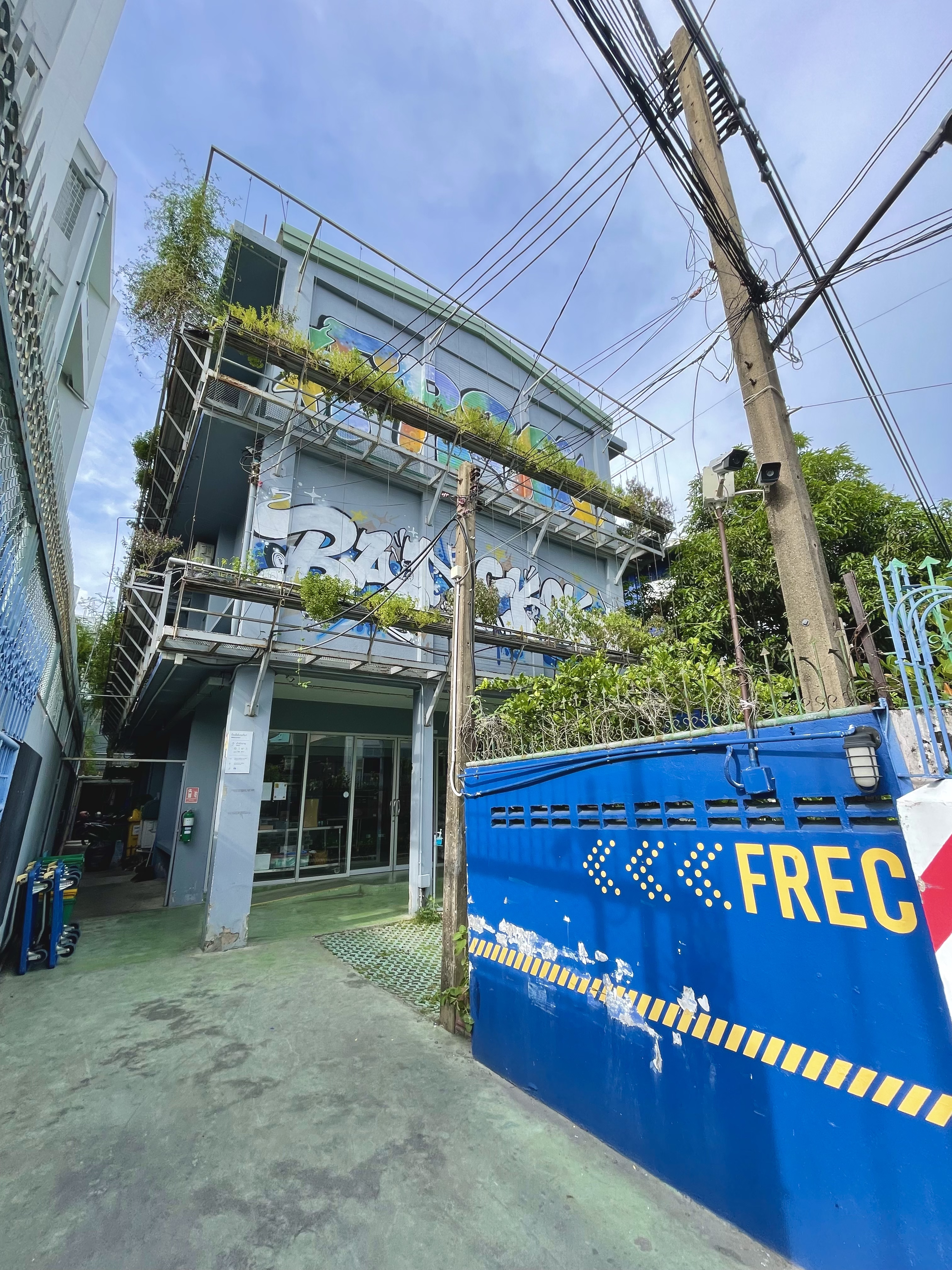
The main building for the Ford Resource and Engagement Center

== History ==
Established in 2019, FREC Bangkok is located at the Satri Julanak school on Nakhon Sawan Road, in Bangkok's historic Nang Loeng neighborhood. The center builds upon the model established by the first FREC in Detroit, Michigan.

== FREC Bangkok Partners ==
- Scholars of Sustenance (SOS)
- Urban Studies Lab (USL)
- Nature Inc.
- Precious Plastics
- FabCafe Bangkok
- Bangkok 1899
- Creative Migration (East)
- Na Café
