= Thewakam Rangrak Bridge =

Thewakam Rangrak Bridge สะพานเทวกรรมรังรักษ์
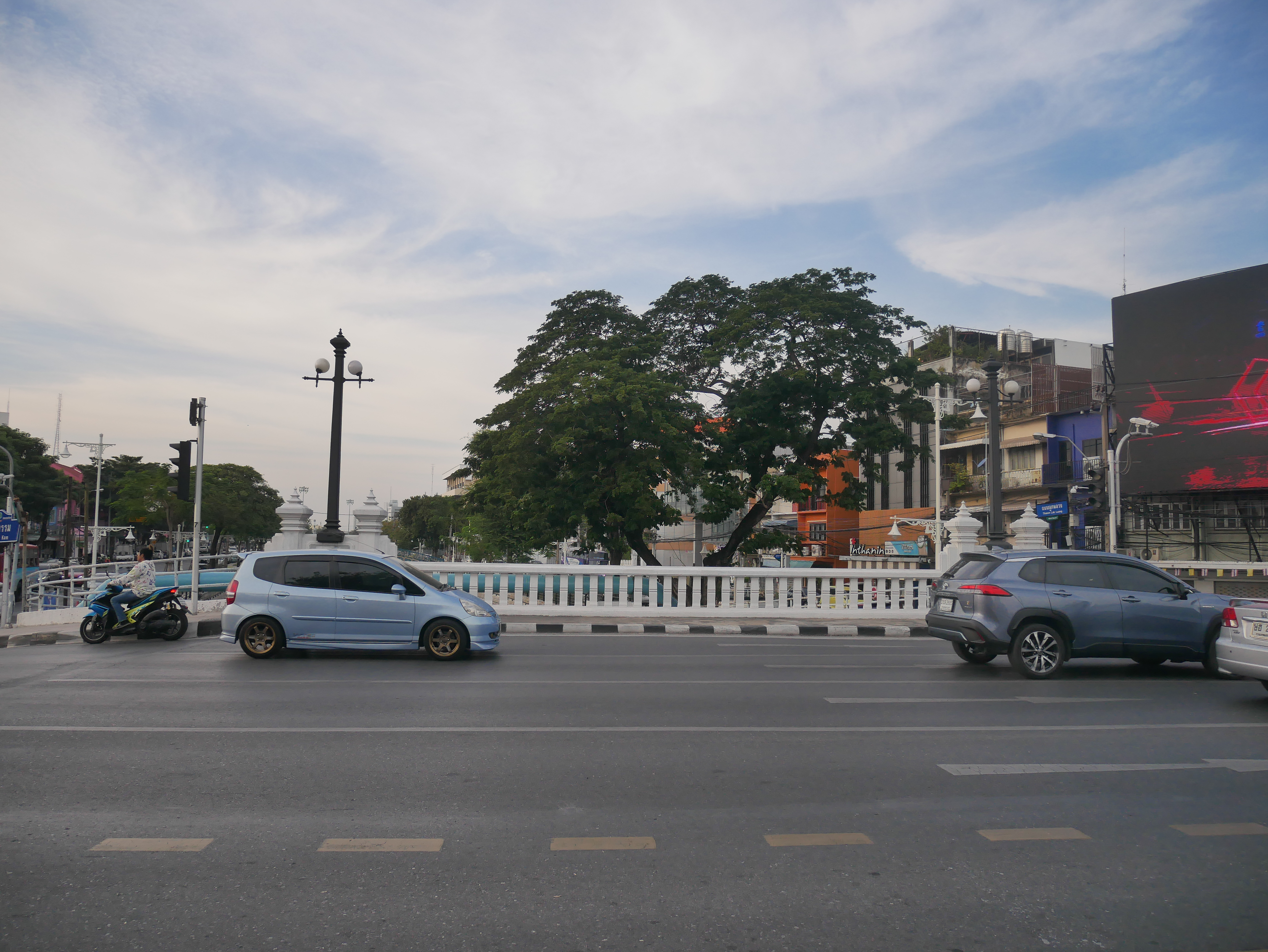
- The bridge in 2023
- Coordinates: 13°45′36.30″N 100°30′45.70″E
- Carries: Nakhon Sawan Road
- Crosses: Khlong Phadung Krung Kasem
- Locale: Wat Sommanat Sub-district, Pom Prap Sattru Phai District and Si Yaek Maha Nak with Suan Chitlada Sub-districts, Dusit District, Bangkok, Thailand
- Official name: Thewakam Rangrak Bridge
- Other name: Thewakam Bridge
- Maintained by: Bangkok Metropolitan Administration (BMA)

History
- Opened: 1900

Location
- Interactive map of Thewakam Rangrak Bridge

Thewakam Rangrak Bridge (Thai: สะพานเทวกรรมรังรักษ์, RTGS: Saphan Thewakam Rangrak, pronounced [sā.pʰāːn tʰēː.wā.kām rāŋ.rák], often referred to simply as "Thewakam Bridge") is a historic bridge in Bangkok, situated on the boundary between Wat Sommanat Subdistrict, Pom Prap Sattru Phai District, and Si Yaek Maha Nak and Suan Chitlada Subdistricts, Dusit District. The bridge crosses the Khlong Phadung Krung Kasem at Nakhon Sawan Road, with its southwestern end meeting Thewa Kam Intersection, where Nakhon Sawan Road intersects with Krung Kasem Road.

Commissioned by King Chulalongkorn (Rama V) in 1899, the Department of Public Works constructed the bridge to link Thanon Talat (ถนนตลาด) with Thanon Plai Talat (ถนนปลายตลาด), now part of Nakhon Sawan Road. King Chulalongkorn presided over its opening ceremony on November 15, 1900. Originally built in its early form, the bridge was later renovated into a concrete structure, and in 1975 it was rebuilt and widened to accommodate modern traffic.

Thewakam Rangrak is one of five bridges crossing the Khlong Phadung Krung Kasem, each named with the meaning "Created by Deity". In this case, "Thewakam" refers to a deity in Thai belief, comparable to the Hindu god Ganesh.

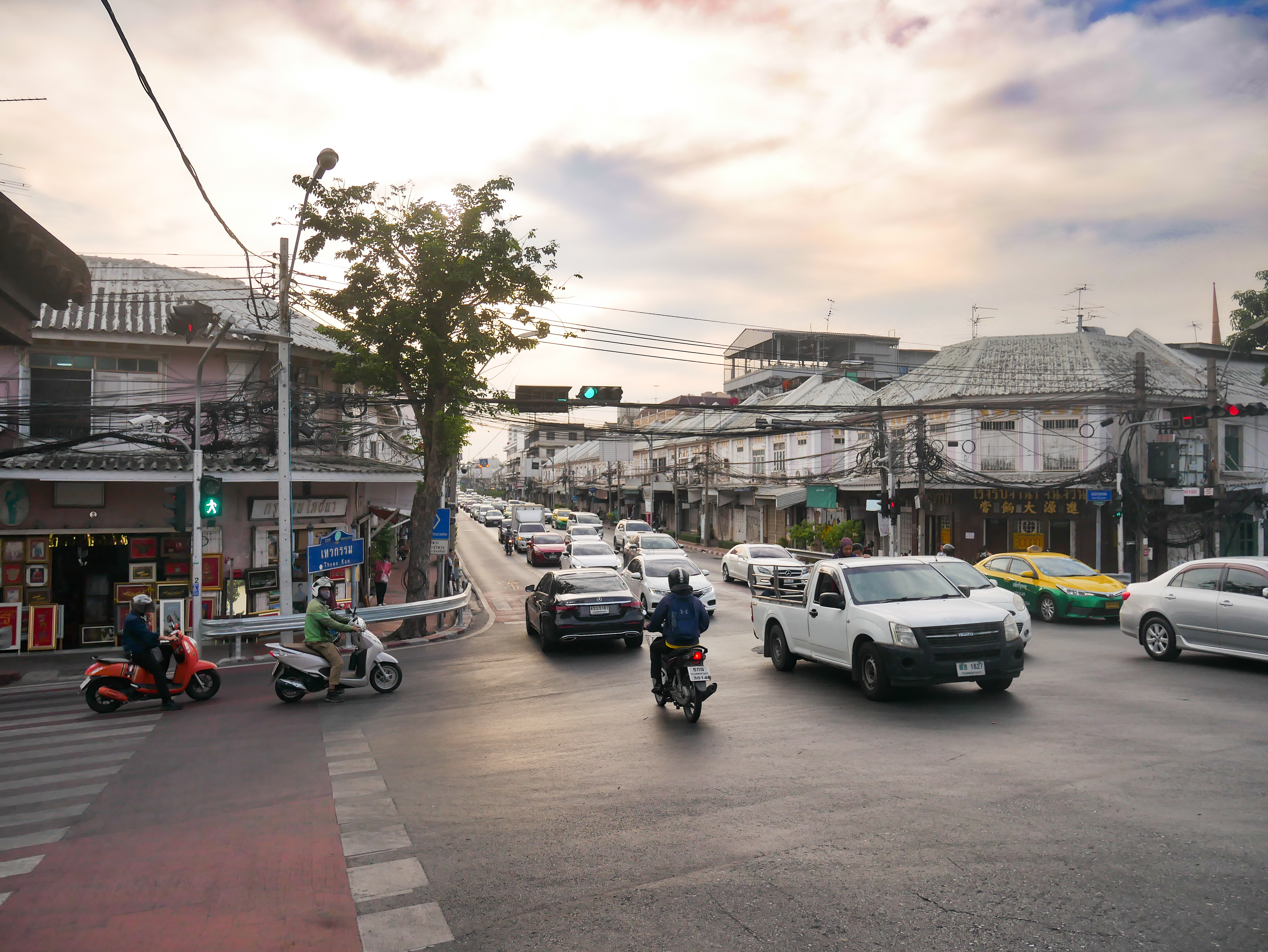
Thewa Kam Intersection

Located near the historic Nang Loeng Market and the Royal Dusit Golf Club (now the location of King Rama IX Memorial Park), and near the Government House, the bridge has also become a notable gathering point for political demonstrations.

== See also ==
- Wisukam Narueman Bridge
- Makkhawan Rangsan Bridge
