= Luk Luang Road =

Road in Bangkok, Thailand

Coordinates: 13.761906°N 100.511540°E

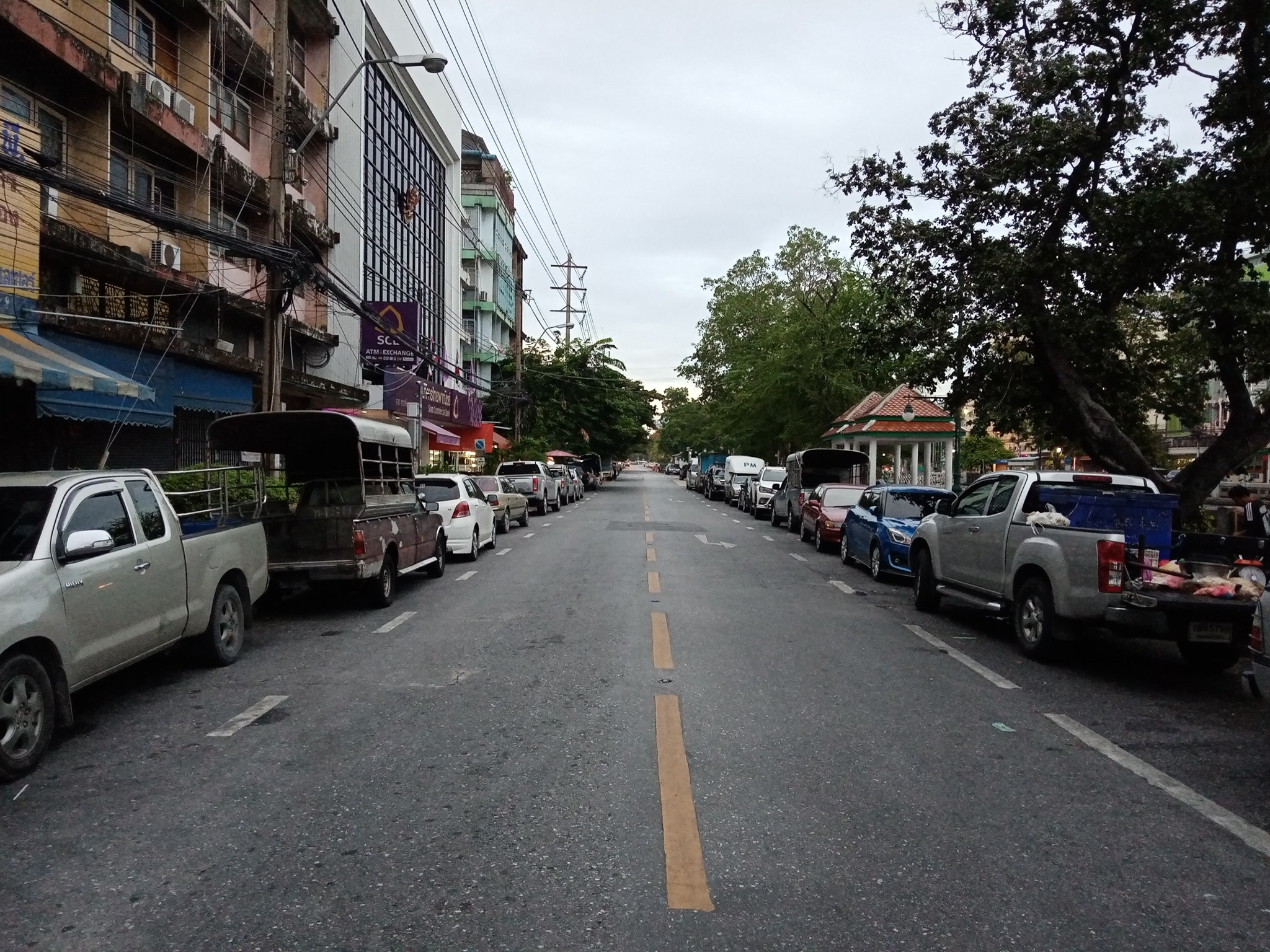
The final stretch of Luk Luang Road in Thewet area

Luk Luang Road (Thai: ถนนลูกหลวง, pronounced [tʰānǒn lûːk lǔa̯ŋ]) is a short street 1.378 km (0.9 mi) long in downtown Bangkok. It runs through three sub-districts of Dusit District, namely Si Yaek Maha Nak, Suan Chitlada, and Dusit.

It is considered one third of the Luang Road series, which includes Luang, Luk Luang, and Lan Luang Roads. These are all short thoroughfares built during the reign of King Chulalongkorn (Rama V).

The street is a canalside road along the northern side of Khlong Phadung Krung Kasem the entire distance. It is parallel to Krung Kasem Road on the southern side.

It begins at the Maha Nak Market, the largest wholesale fruit center in Bangkok, then straight to the northwest. Luk Luang Road ends at Thewet Bridge, where it meets Samsen Road.

It was built along with the excavation of the outer city moat, Khlong Phadung Krung Kasem. When finished, the King Chulalongkorn named it Luk Luang, which means "royal children", because it ran past the residences of high-ranking members of the royal family, all of whom had the status of being the King's children. One of them is Ladawan Palace, (Note: The residence of Prince Yugala Dighambara.) which is now Crown Property Bureau (CPB) Head Office.

Bordering the street are (most are government offices besides the Crown Property Bureau) Government House and Ministry of Education.

Wat Samananam Borihan, commonly known as Wat Yuan Saphan Khao (Note: Also known as Cảnh Phước Tự in Annamese.) is one of the interesting places along the street. It is a historic Annamese Buddhist temple of the Mahāyāna sect. The area where the monastery is situated during the reign of King Nangklao (Rama III) was the residence of Annamese (modern-day Vietnamese) immigrants.

In the 1970s and 1980s, Luk Luang Road also served as the venue for the Thailand Book Fair. An annual event held between the end of March and the beginning of April by the Ministry of Education, before moving to the Queen Sirikit National Convention Center (QSNCC) in the 1990s.
