= Wat Sommanat Wihan =

Wat Sommanat Ratchaworawihan
- Wat Sommanat
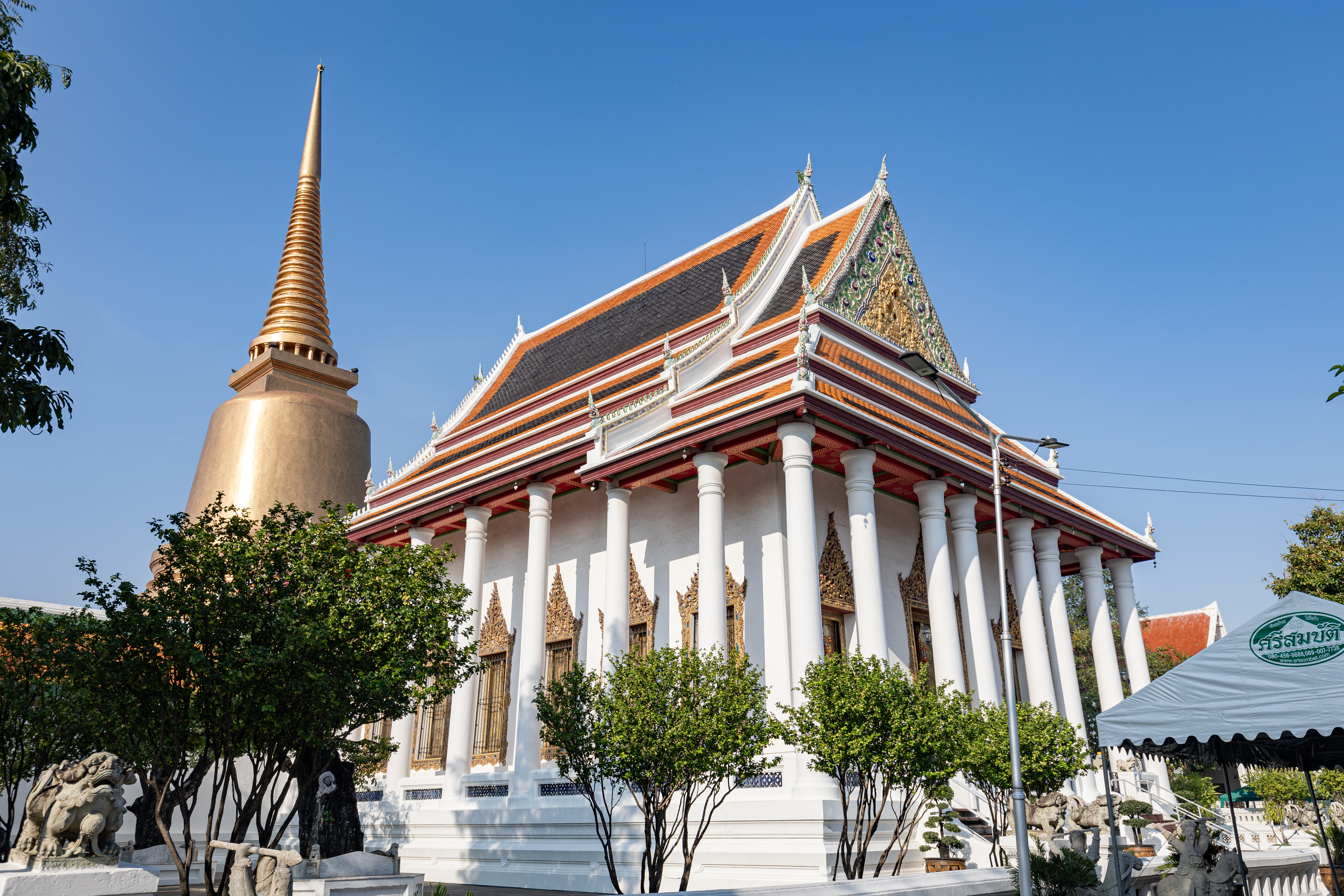

- Location within Bangkok

Religion
- Affiliation: Buddhism
- Sect: Theravāda, Thammayut
- Status: Active

Location
- Location: 646 Krung Kasem Rd., Wat Sommanat, Pom Prap Sattru Phai, Bangkok
- Country: Thailand
- Interactive map of Wat Sommanat Ratchaworawihan
- Coordinates: 13.760645°N 100.510515°E

Architecture
- Founder: King Mongkut
- Completed: 1856; 170 years ago

Website
- www.watsomanas.com/eng/index.php

Wat Sommanat Ratchaworawihan (Thai: วัดโสมนัสราชวรวิหาร) or known in short Wat Sommanat Wihan and Wat Sommanat is a second classed royal Thai Buddhist monastery was built in 1853 by the order of King Mongkut (Rama IV) as a dedication and memorial to the Queen Consort Somanass Waddhanawathy, his first wife, who died at the age of 17.

The temple faces Khlong Phadung Krung Kasem canal in the area of Nang Loeng, Pom Prap Sattru Phai District, Bangkok, and considered the closest temple to the Government House. In addition to being built to commemorate his first wife, the King also built this temple like the one that used to exist in Ayutthaya, a former capital of Thailand.

The ordination hall of the temple is surrounded by two layers of traditional boundary wall. Therefore, this temple has an accurate and complete layout according to principles of Buddhism. The door and window frames are decorated with gilded stucco and stained glasses design with the pattern of confederate rose flowers. The gables are also stucco decorated with glazed tiles, having the royal insignia of King Mongkut and his wife in the middle. Inside the ordination hall, the principal Buddha image named Phra Buddha Siri cast and brought from Wat Rachathiwat in the quarter of Samsen in 1856 (year the temple was completed) by Somdet Phra Wannarat (Buddha Siri, pioneer of the Thammayut sect) is enshrined. In addition, in the same agenda, a total of 40 monks were transferred from Wat Rachathiwat to the temple along with Somdet Phra Wannarat was also appointed from the King as the first abbot.

At the centre area of the temple, there is a huge striking golden stūpa with the Lord Buddha's relics contained inside, in addition, there is also a white Lanka-styled stūpa not far from each other. Which the aforementioned stūpa, there are only two in Thailand (another one located at Wat Kanmatuyaram in Chinatown). Bell and drum tower are round towers with Chinese-styled roof. According to the temple has two layers of boundary wall, therefore the monks can do religious rites in both ordination hall and sanctuary without interference from outsiders.

Wat Sommanat Wihan is also considered an official crematorium of the Royal Thai Army (RTA).

== Gallery ==
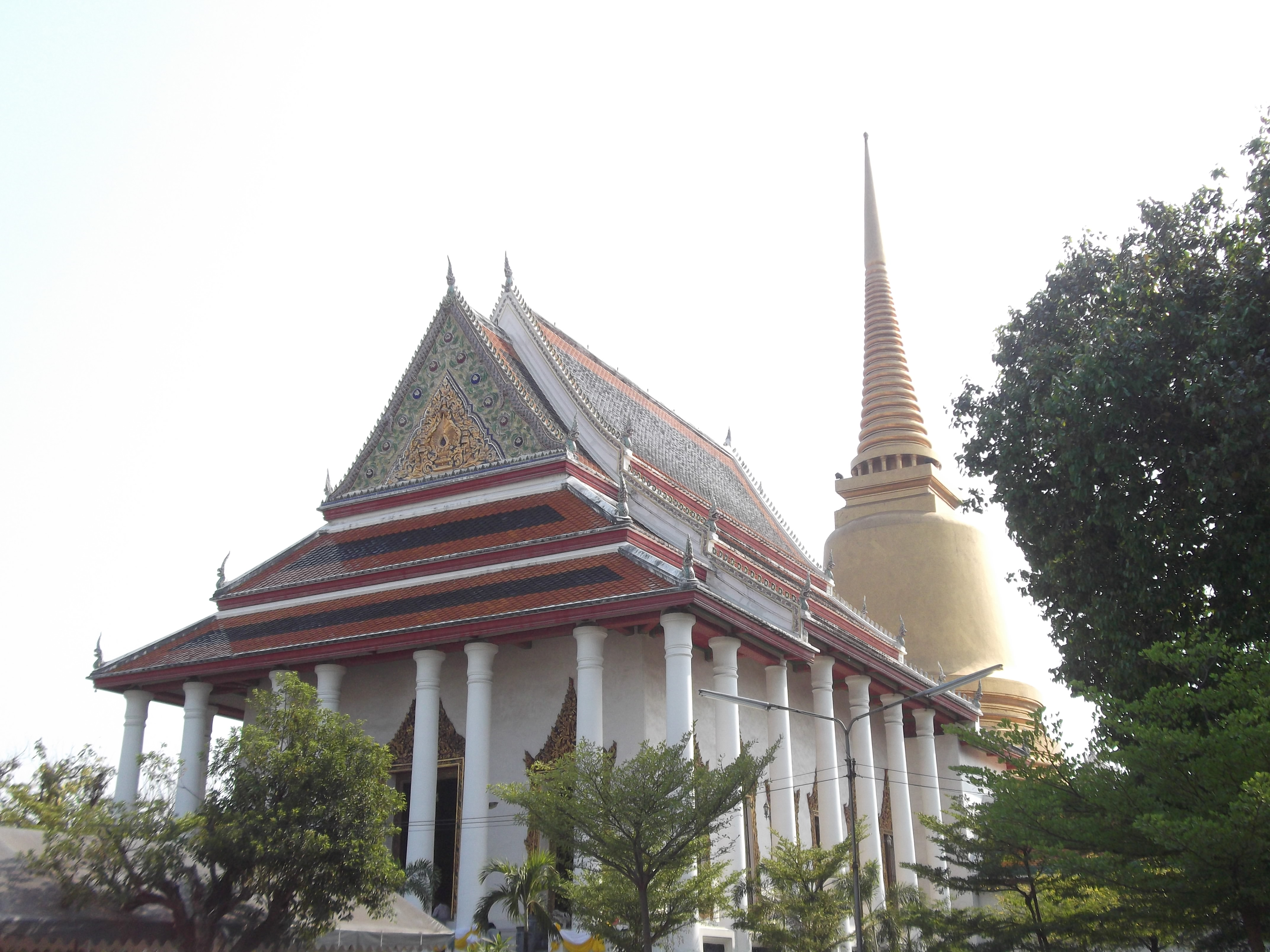
Ordination hall and main golden stūpa

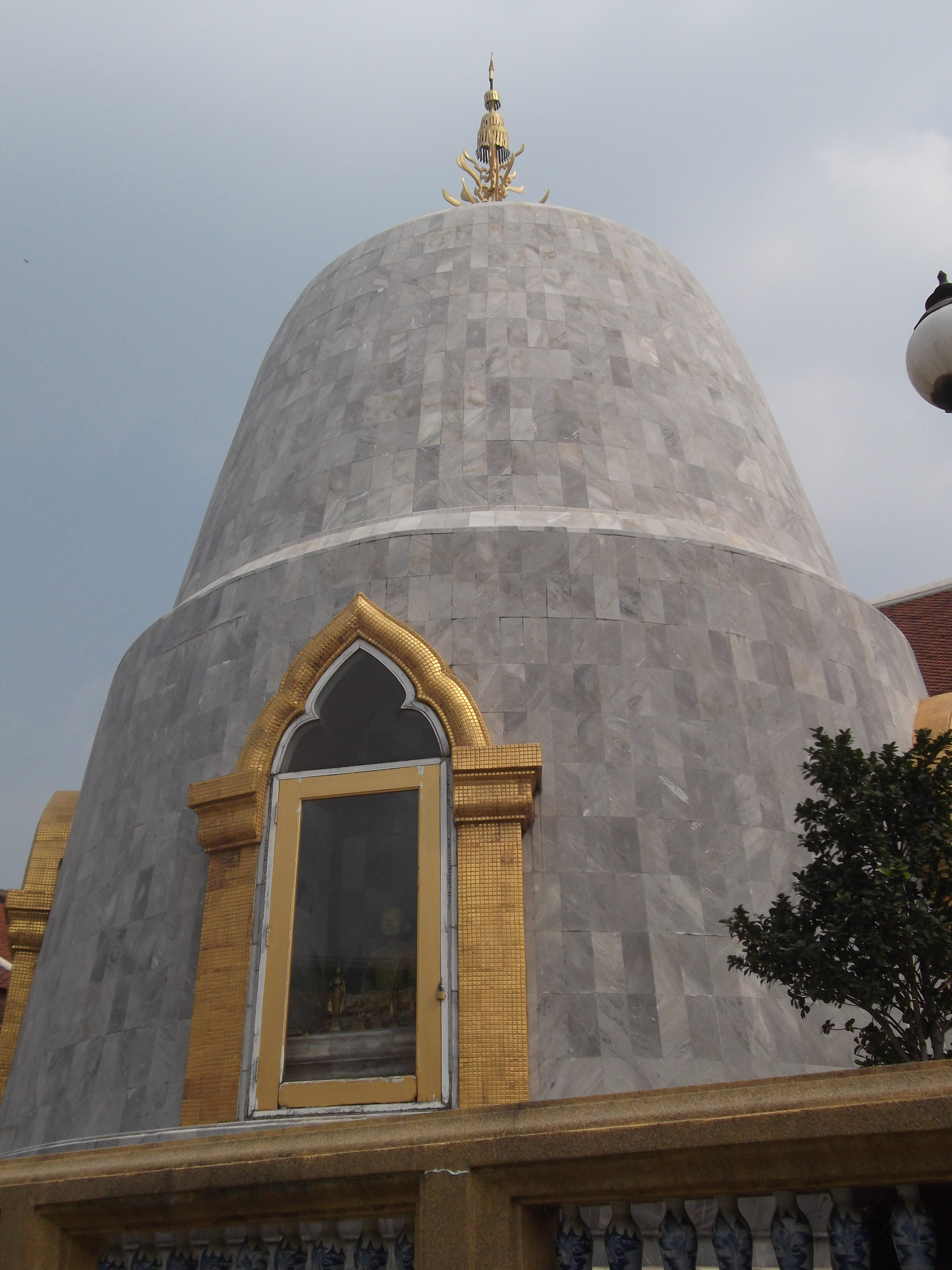
White Lanka-styled stūpa, only two in Thailand

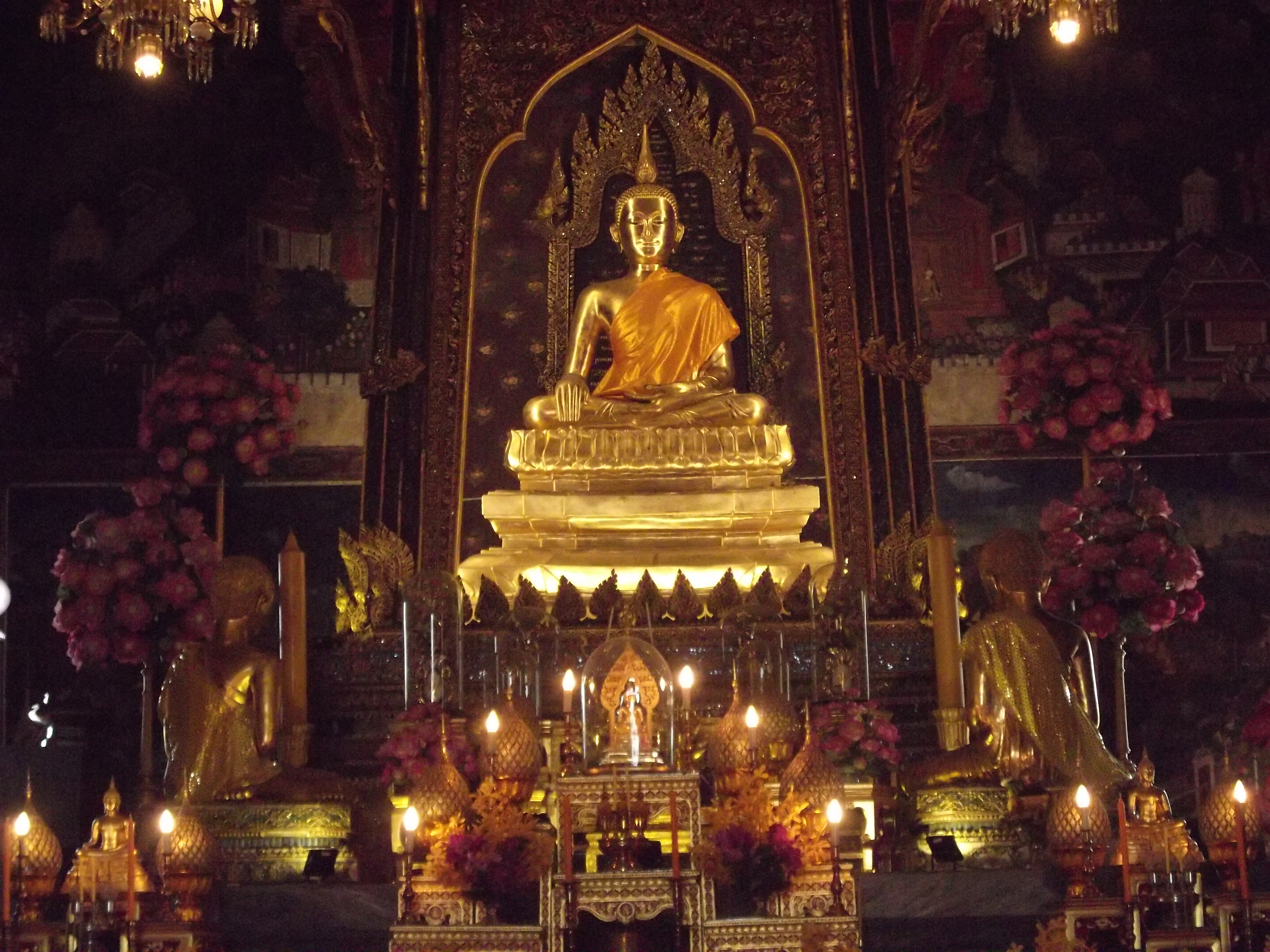
Principal Buddha image

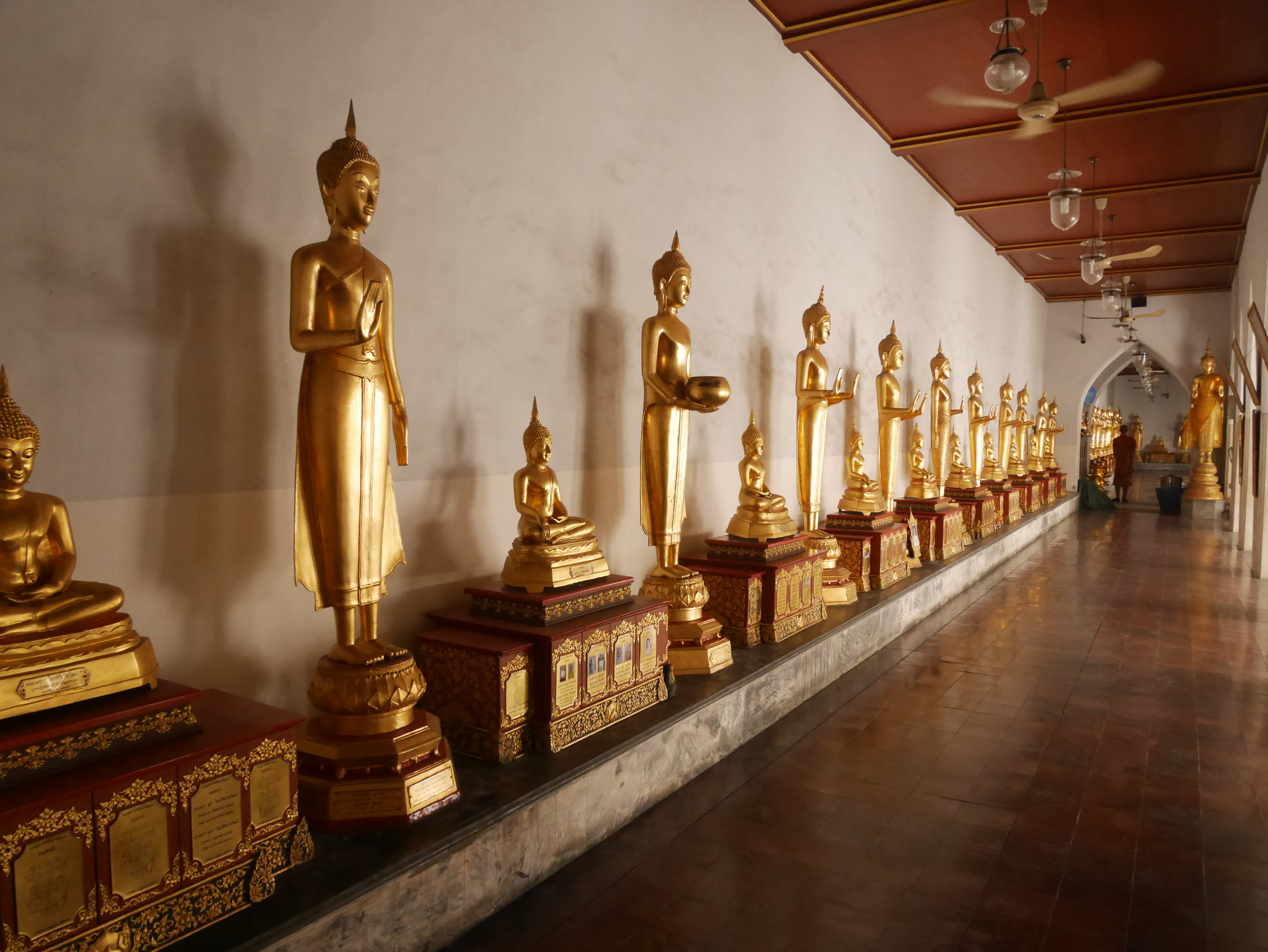
Buddha images line the cloister

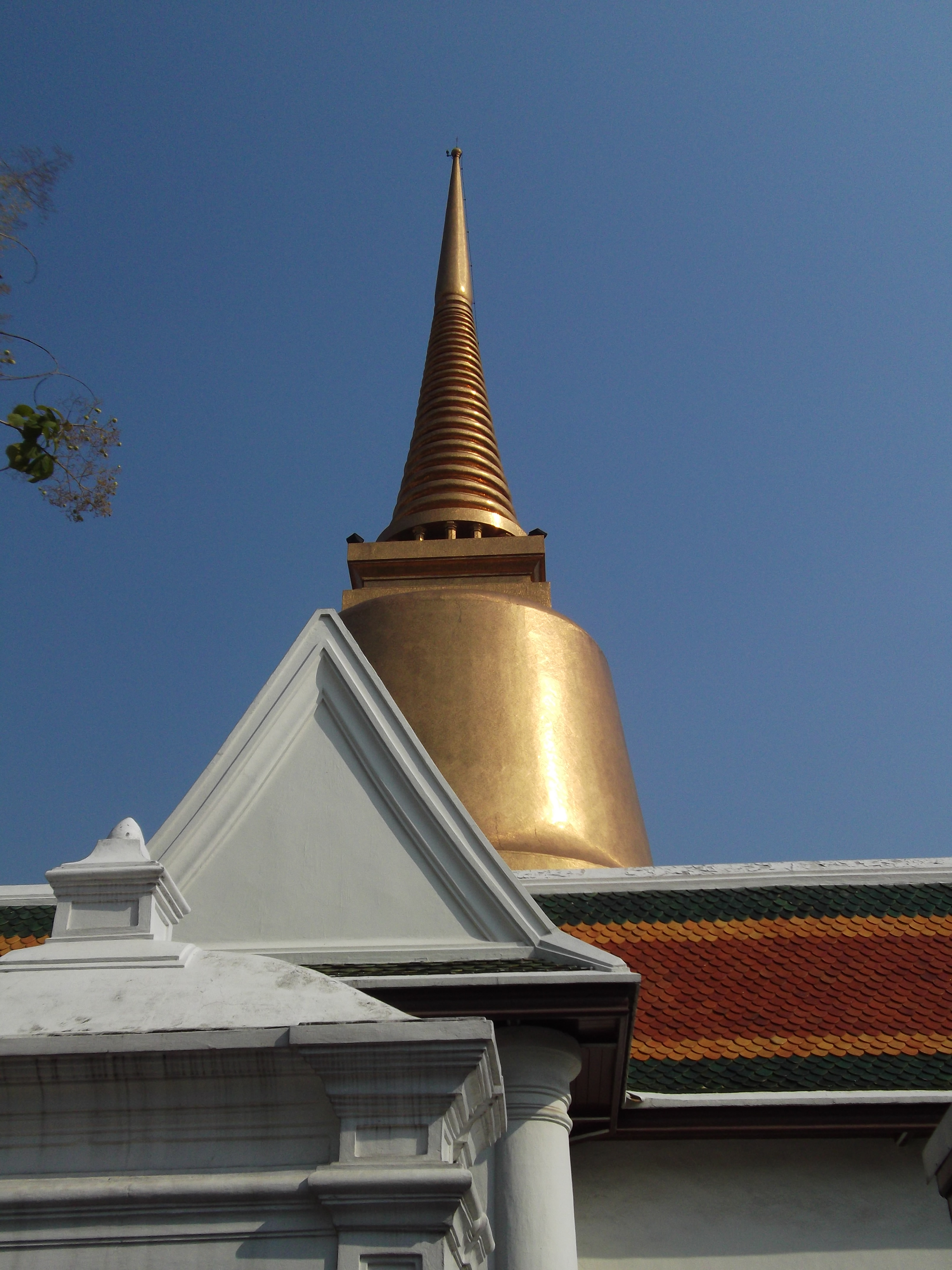
Main golden stūpa
