= Khlong Maha Nak =

Canal in Bangkok, Thailand

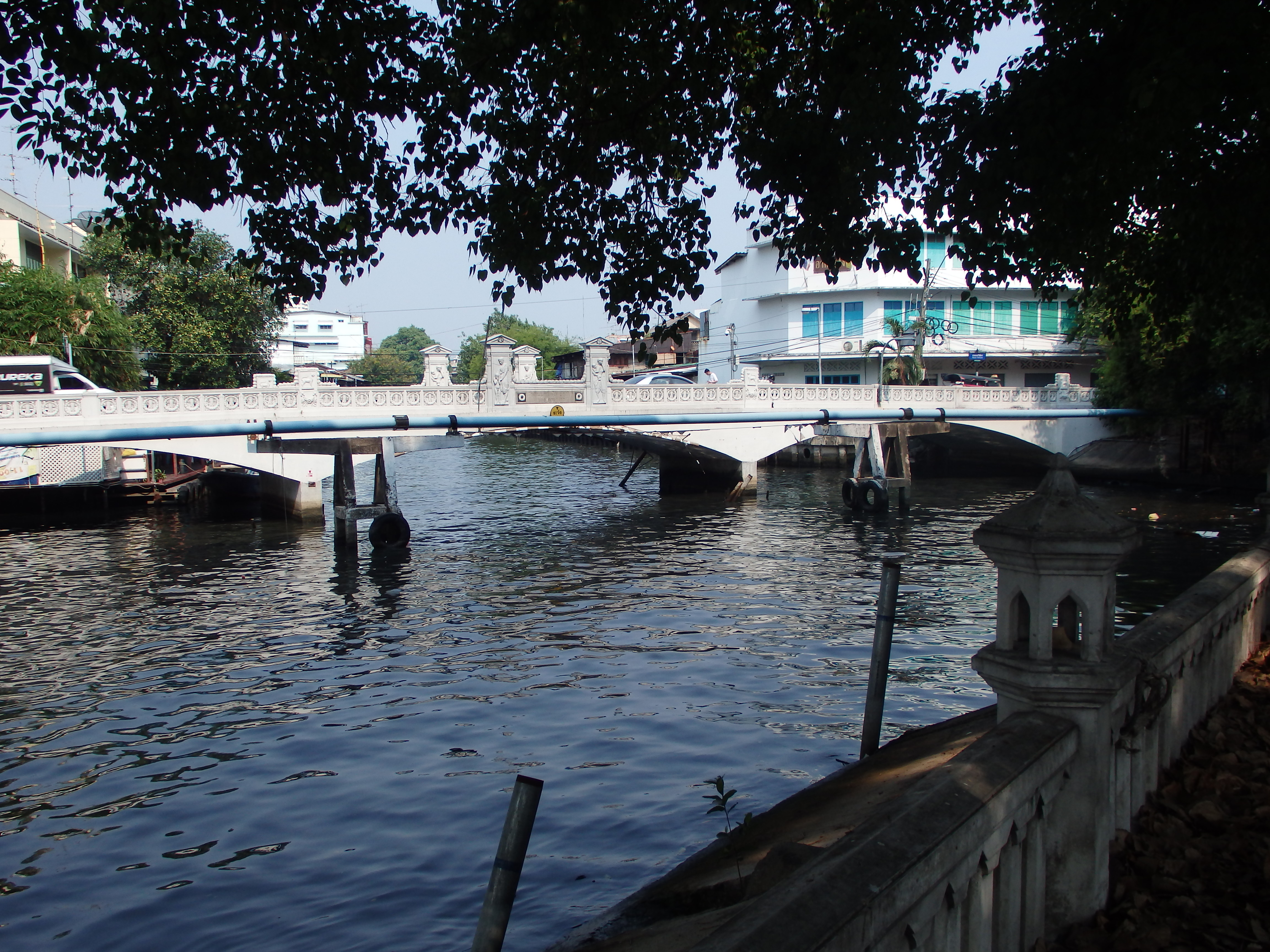
- Khlong Mahanak, near Mahathai Uthit Bridge
- Country: Thailand
- Coordinates: 13.754423°N 100.511030°E

Specifications
- Length: 1.254 km (0.779 miles)

History
- Modern name: คลองมหานาค
- Construction began: 1783 or 1785

Geography
- Start point: Khlong Rop Krung near Phan Fa Lilat Bridge and Mahat Thai Uthit bridge
- End point: Khlong Phadung Krung Kasem and Khlong Saen Saep near Charoen Rat 32 Bridge
- Beginning coordinates: 13.755481°N 100.506038°E
- Ending coordinates: 13.753110°N 100.517220°E

Khlong Maha Nak (Thai: คลองมหานาค, pronounced [kʰlɔ̄ːŋ mā.hǎː nâːk]) is a historic khlong (canal) in Bangkok and is considered one of the city's oldest waterways. It begins at Khlong Rop Krung (the old city moat) near Mahakan Fort and Wat Saket's Golden Mount, and extends eastward, ending at the intersection with Khlong Saen Saep in the Ban Khrua quarter, with a total length of 1.3 km (0.8 mi).

The canal was initiated under the royal directive of King Phutthayotfa Chulalok (Rama I) in 1783, one year after the establishment of the Rattanakosin Kingdom (modern-day Bangkok). It was used as a waterway for boating and for performing Khlon Sakkawa (กลอนสักวา), a form of Thai poetic recitation. The canal's name is derived from a similarly named canal in the old Ayutthaya Kingdom and is believed to honor a Buddhist monk named Maha Nak, who originally initiated its construction for strategic purposes following the Burmese–Siamese War of 1547–1549.

The eastern end of the canal connects with Khlong Saen Saep, which has long served as a main waterway for transportation. During the reigns of King Mongkut (Rama IV) and King Chulalongkorn (Rama V), the canal became a popular floating market, as it formed part of the route to Chachoengsao in eastern Thailand. Today, the area hosts the wholesale Bobae Market, known for inexpensive clothing, as well as the city's largest wholesale fruit market, Maha Nak Market (also called Saphan Khao Market). The canal also defines the administrative boundaries of two subdistricts under the Bangkok Metropolitan Administration (BMA): Si Yaek Maha Nak in Dusit District and Khlong Maha Nak in Pom Prap Sattru Phai District.

The section of Khlong Maha Nak near Bobae is home to one of Bangkok's oldest Muslim communities, centered around the Masjid Maha Nak.
