= Wat Sommanat subdistrict =

Coordinates: 13.758427°N 100.513061°E

Wat Sommanat วัดโสมนัส
- Khwaeng
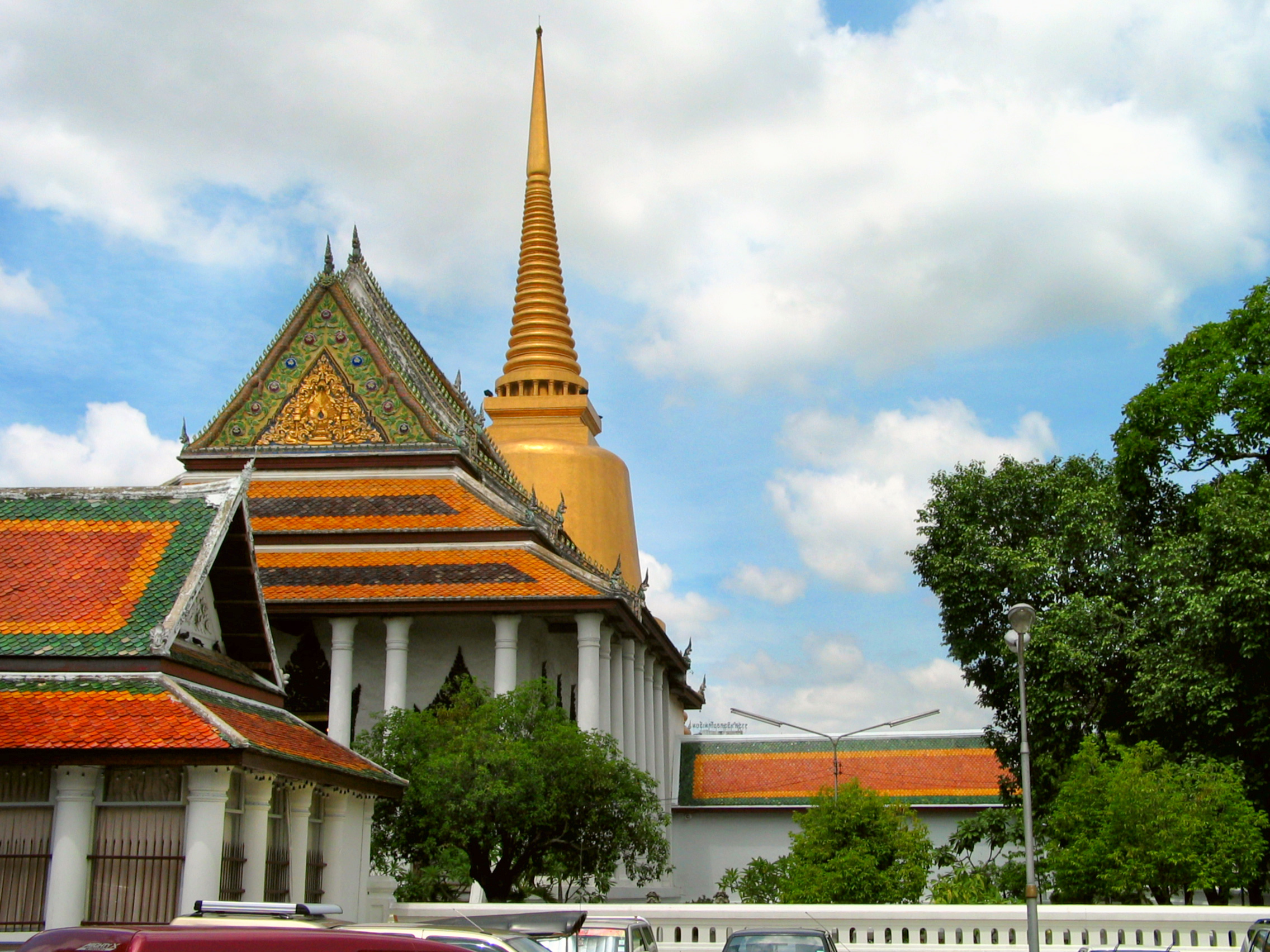
- The eponymous Wat Sommanat Wihan

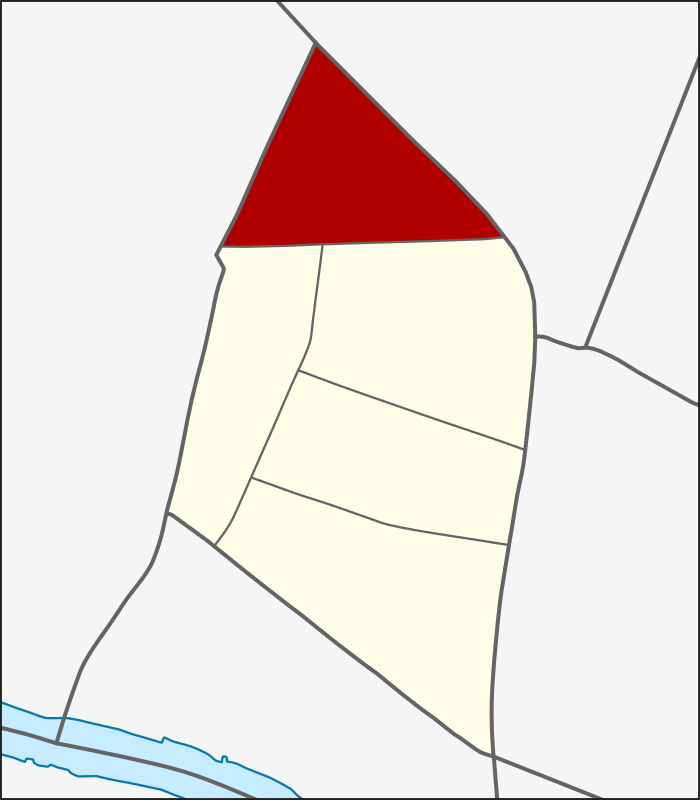
- Location in Pom Prap Sattru Phai District
- Country: Thailand
- Province: Bangkok
- Khet: Pom Prap Sattru Phai

Area
  - Total: 0.350 km^{2} (0.135 sq mi)

Population (2019)
  - Total: 6,672
- Time zone: UTC+7 (ICT)
- Postal code: 10100
- TIS 1099: 100805

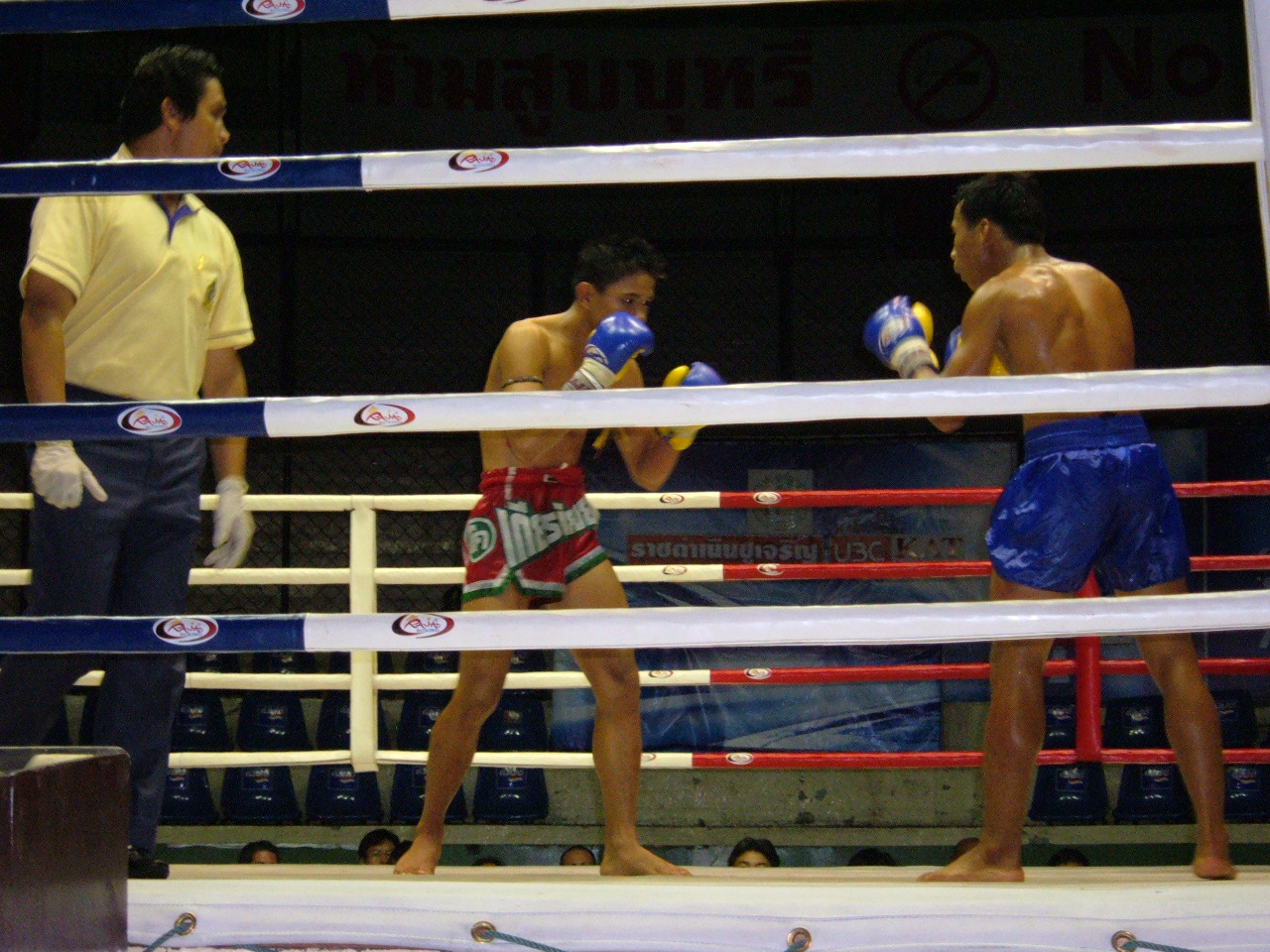
Muay Thai bout at Rajadamnern Boxing Stadium

Wat Sommanat (Thai: วัดโสมนัส, pronounced [wát sǒːm.mā.nát]) is a khwaeng (sub-district) in Pom Prap Sattru Phai District, Bangkok.

== Description & topography ==
Wat Sommanat is named after Wat Sommanat Wihan, a local Buddhist temple that faces Khlong Phadung Krung Kasem canal. The area is considered as the northernmost part of the district, with a total area of 0.350 km^{2} (0.135 mi^{2}).

The sub-district bordered by other areas (from the north clockwise): Dusit and Suan Chitlada in Dusit District (Khlong Phadung Krung Kasem is a borderline), Si Yaek Maha Nak in Dusit District (Khlong Phadung Krung Kasem is a borderline), Khlong Maha Nak and Ban Bat in its district (Lan Luang Road is a borderline), and Ban Phan Thom with Bang khun Phrom in Phra Nakhon District (Outer Ratchadamnoen Avenue is a borderline).

It can also be divided into five communities.

Nang Loeng is another name for the area.

== Population ==
In 2019, it had a total population of 6,672 people.

== Places ==
- Pom Prap Sattru Phai Office District
- Wat Sommanat Wihan
- Wat Sunthorn Thammathan (Wat Khae Nang Loeng)
- Talat Nang Loeng
- Thewakam Rangrak Bridge (shared with Si Yaek Maha Nak and Suan Chitlada of Dusit)
- Rajadamnern Boxing Stadium
- Ministry of Tourism and Sports
- Nanglerng Police Station
- King Prajadhipok Museum
