= Wisukam Narueman Bridge =

Wisukam Narueman Bridge สะพานวิศุกรรมนฤมาณ
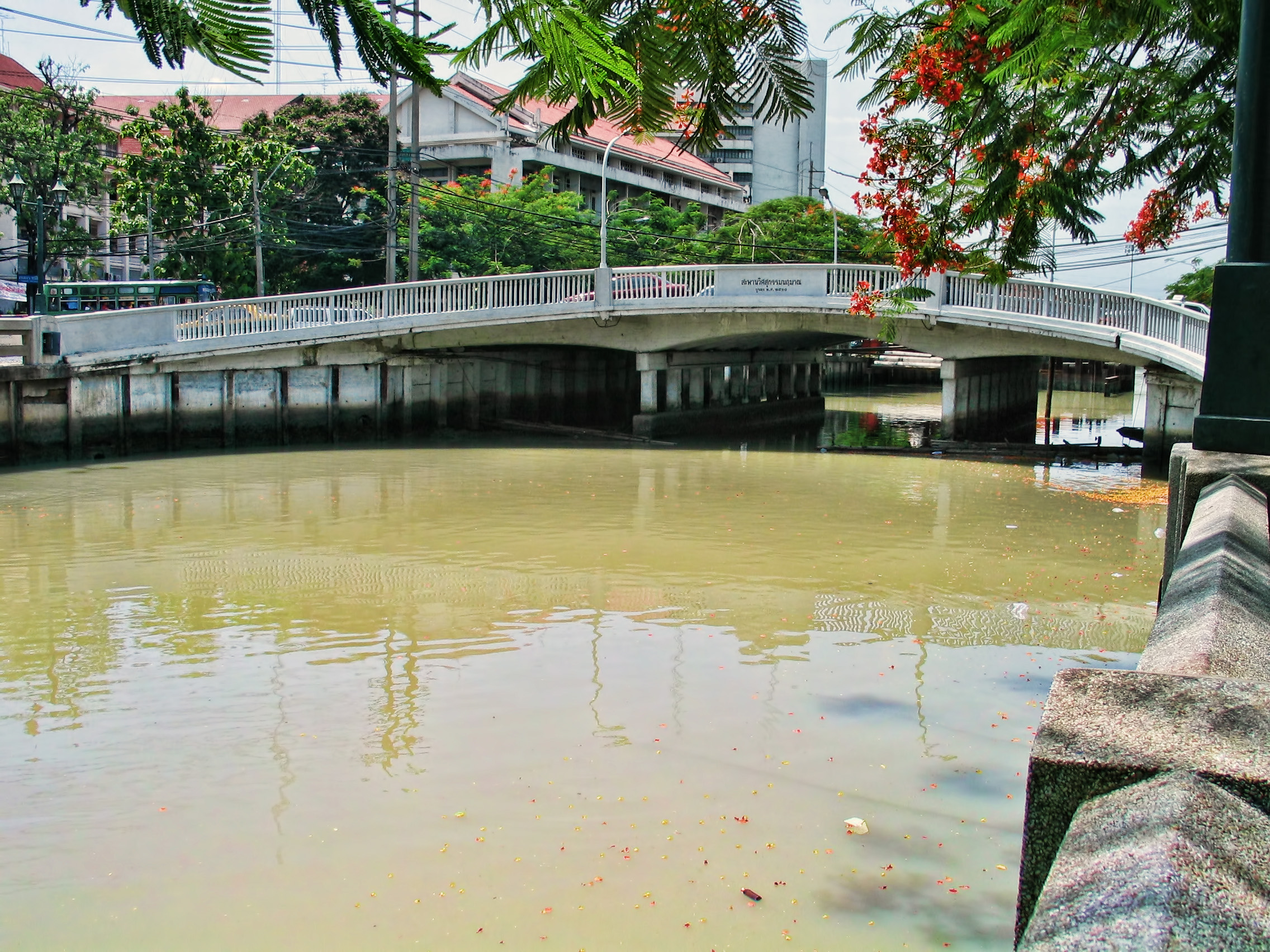
- View of the Wisukam Narueman Bridge from Krung Kasem Road in 2003
- Coordinates: 13°45′59″N 100°30′24″E
- Carries: Prachathipatai Road
- Crosses: Khlong Phadung Krung Kasem
- Locale: Bang Khun Phrom Sub-District, Phra Nakhon District and Dusit Sub-district, Dusit District, Bangkok, Thailand
- Official name: Wisukam Narueman Bridge
- Other name(s): Witsukam Narueman Bridge
- Maintained by: Bangkok Metropolitan Administration (BMA)

History
- Opened: 1901

Wisukam Narueman Bridge (Thai: สะพานวิศุกรรมนฤมาณ; RTGS: Saphan Wisukam Narueman) is an historic bridge of Bangkok located in the border of Bang Khun Phrom sub-district, Phra Nakhon district and Dusit sub-district, Dusit district.

King Chulalongkorn (Rama V) ordered the Department of Public Works to build the bridge across Khlong Phadung Krung Kasem (Phadung Krung Kasem canal) linking to Prachathipatai road. It was named "Wisukam Narueman" (translates as The Bridge was Built by Vishvakarman), and opened in 1901. At first it was built of iron structure with wooden pavement and cast iron balustrade. Later, in 1967 it was restored expanded and changed into reinforced concrete. The bridge walls are of concrete balustrade with the bridge's name as Witsukam Narueman (วิศสุกรรมนฤมาณ), which is different spelling from the king's given name, and the year of restoration (1967) inscribed at the center. It's one of the bridge with the name of deity (Thewet Naruemit Bridge, Wisukam Narueman Bridge, Makkhawan Rangsan Bridge, Thewakam Rangrak Bridge and Jaturapak Rangsarit Bridge, respectively).
