= Varadis Palace =

Museum and library in a former royal residence

Coordinates: 13°45′23″N 100°30′49″E

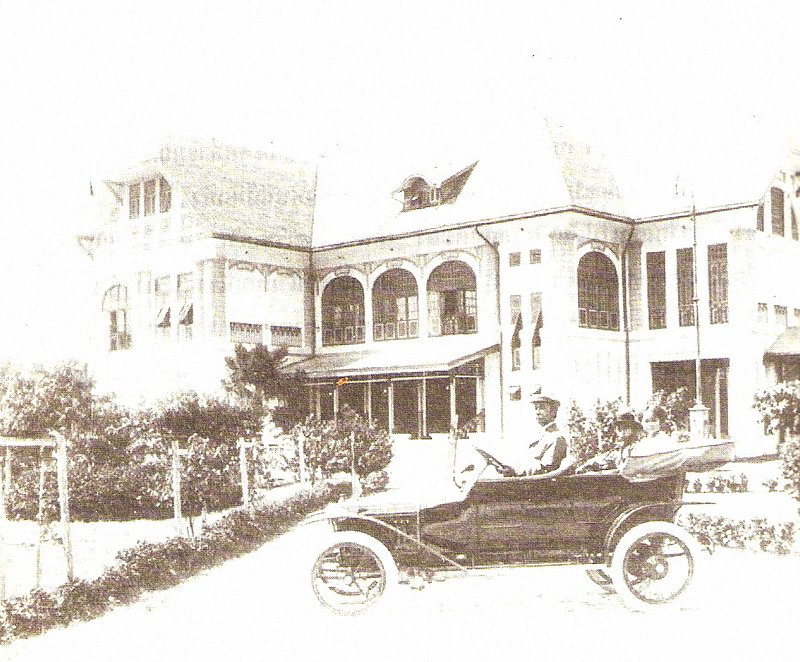
Prince Damrong Rajanubhab in front of the Varadis Palace

Varadis Palace (Thai: วังวรดิศ; RTGS: Wang Woradit) is the former residence of Prince Tisavarakumarn, the Prince Damrong Rajanubhab on Lan Luang Road in Bangkok, Thailand. The palace was built in 1911 by German architect Karl Döhring during the reign of King Rama V to the reign of King Rama VI. After Prince Tisavarakumarn died at this palace on 1 December 1943, the palace was preserved by his heir Mom Rajawongse Sangkadis Diskul, former Ambassador to Malaysia, Switzerland and the Vatican and presently by his great-grandson, Mom Luang Panadda Diskul, former Provincial Governor of Nakhon Pathom and Chiang Mai and a member of the House of Senate.

In 1977, the palace building was renovated and converted into a museum and library. Princess Galyani Vadhana, the elder sister of Thailand's King Bhumibol, presided over the opening ceremony on 12 September 1977. The palace was awarded outstanding conservation building by The Association of Siamese Architects in 1984.
