= Bobae Market =

Cheap clothing market in Bangkok, Thailand

Coordinates: 13°45′12.49″N 100°30′57.38″E

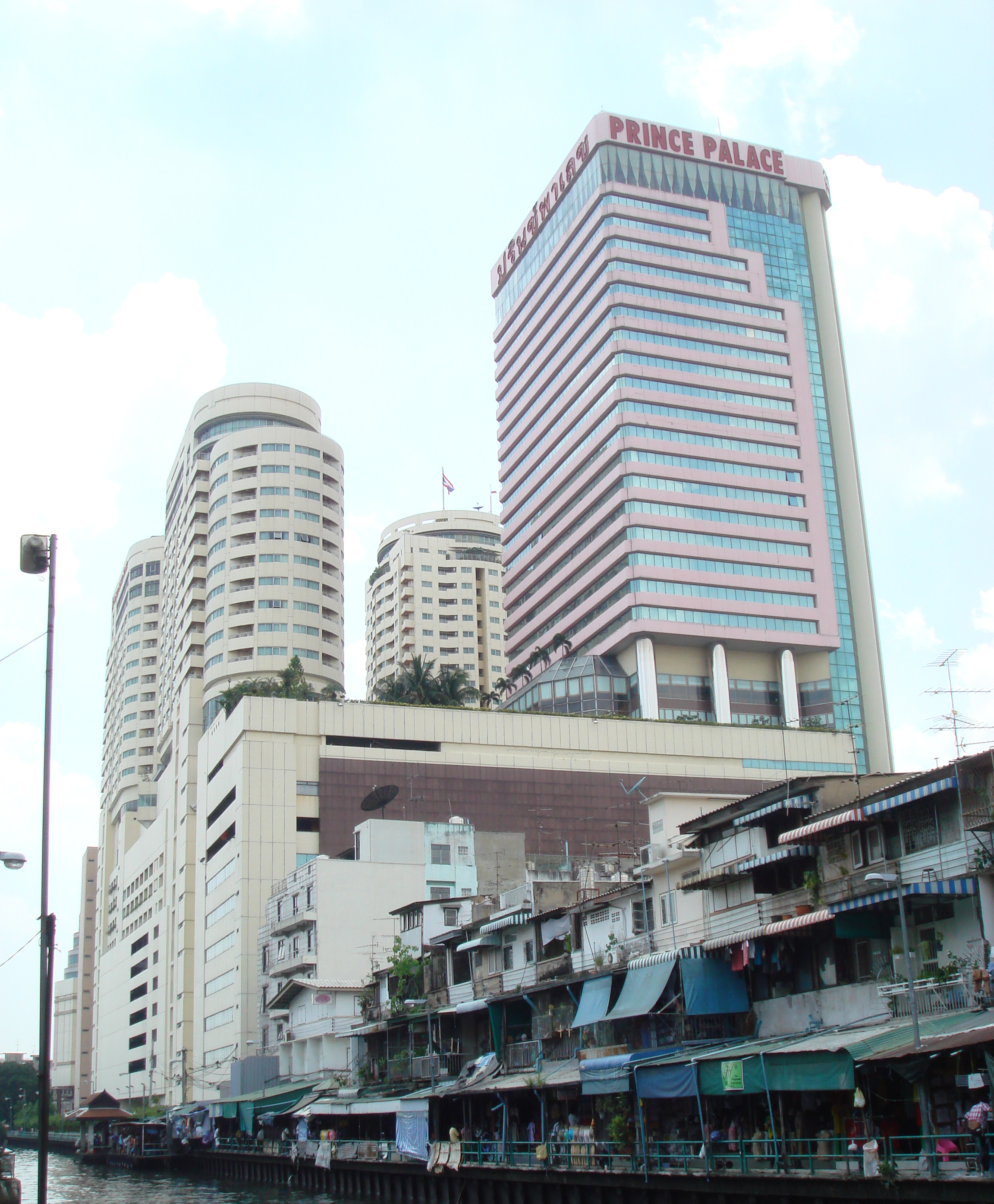
Bobae Tower and Prince Palace Hotel

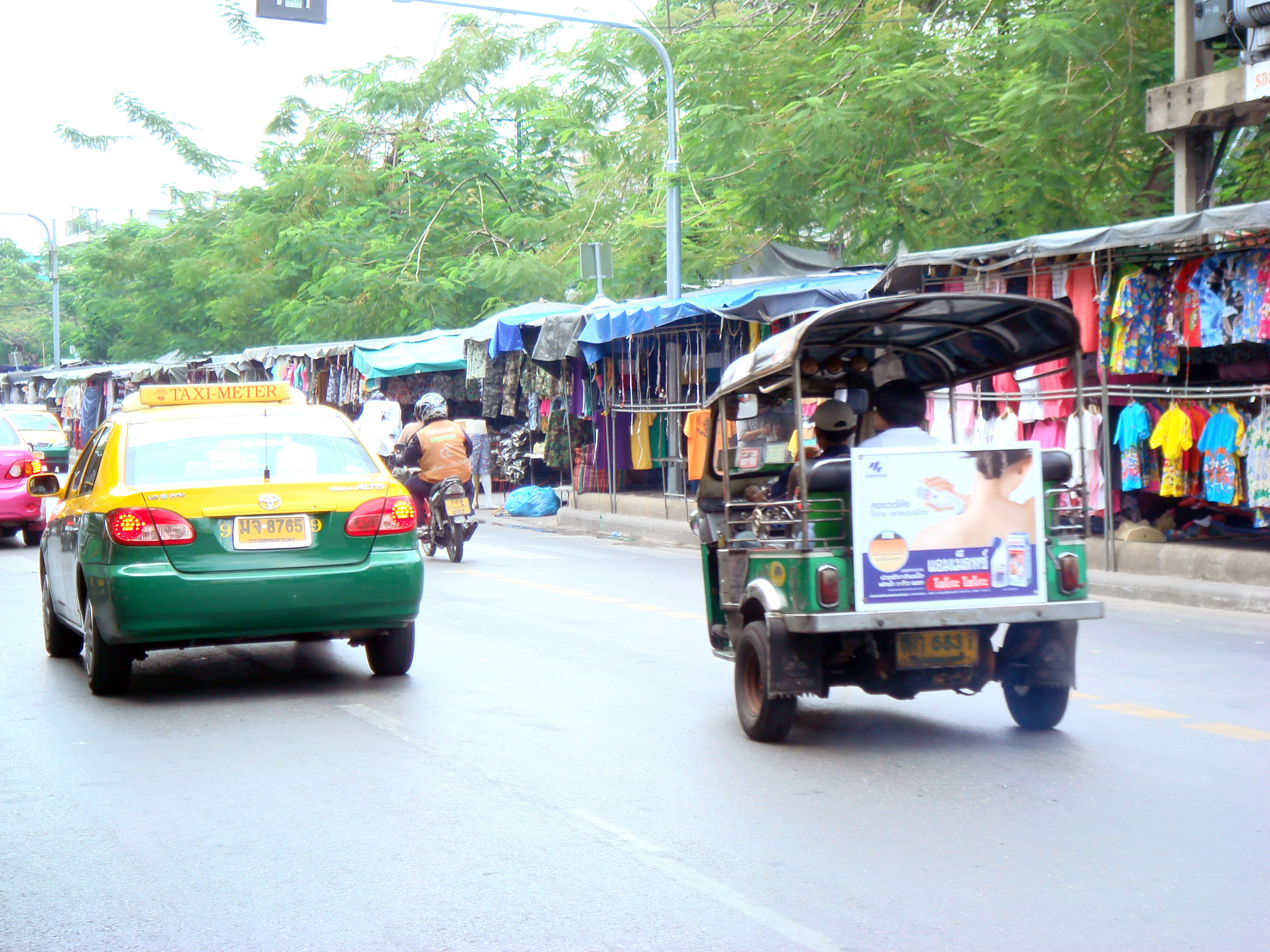
Street stalls (in 2013)

Bobae Market (Thai: ตลาดโบ๊เบ๊, RTGS: Talat Bobe, pronounced [tā.làːt bóː.béː]), commonly referred to as Bobae, is a well-known cheap clothing market, both retail and wholesale. The market area has two major wholesale shopping complexes, Bobae Market and Bobae Tower. Bobae Market itself is divided into five sections, commonly referred to as the "five bridges."

Bobae is located on Krung Kasem Road along Khlong Phadung Krung Kasem, at the point where it intersects with Khlong Maha Nak in Khlong Maha Nak Subdistrict, Pom Prap Sattru Phai District. The market stretches between Yotse Bridge and Jaturapak Rangsarit Bridge in Si Yaek Maha Nak Subdistrict, Dusit District, with some parts overlapping into Rong Mueang Subdistrict, Pathum Wan District.

The term bobae in Thai means "noisy" or "boisterous." It is believed to have been derived from the word bong beng (บ้งเบ้ง), which describes the bustling condition of the market.

Bobae was established around 1927 by a group of Sino Thai merchants who originally sold local products such as coconut water, tea, coffee, and agricultural goods. During World War II, the market shifted its focus to second-hand clothing, much of which came from deceased soldiers.

The market operates daily from 6:00 a.m. to 6:00 p.m., after which night vendors arrive and continue trading until dawn. At night, in particular, the market becomes especially vibrant and crowded.

Bobae is served by just one BMTA bus route, 2-9 (53), with a total of six bus stops along both sides of Krung Kasem Road. The market is also accessible via the Khlong Saen Saep boat service at Talad Bobae Pier (W03).

In 2023, the Bangkok Metropolitan Administration (BMA) introduced a policy to improve the landscape of Khlong Phadung Krung Kasem. As a result, Bobae Market, which is located along the canal, was among those affected. The canalside stalls were dismantled, impacting up to 600 vendors. The trading atmosphere, especially at night, has since changed significantly from the past. Authorities are also encouraging existing vendors to relocate indoors to Bobae Station, a mall-like building situated on the Rong Mueang side.

== Nearby places ==
- Hua Lamphong
- Debsirin School
- Maha Nak Market or Saphan Khao Market
- Hua Chiew Hospital
- Charoen Rat 32 Bridge
- Maha Nak Mosque
- Prince Palace Hotel
- Ministry of Social Development and Human Security
- Wat Boromniwat
