= Khlong Maha Nak subdistrict =

Coordinates: 13°45′10.1″N 100°30′52.9″E

Khlong Maha Nak คลองมหานาค
- Khwaeng
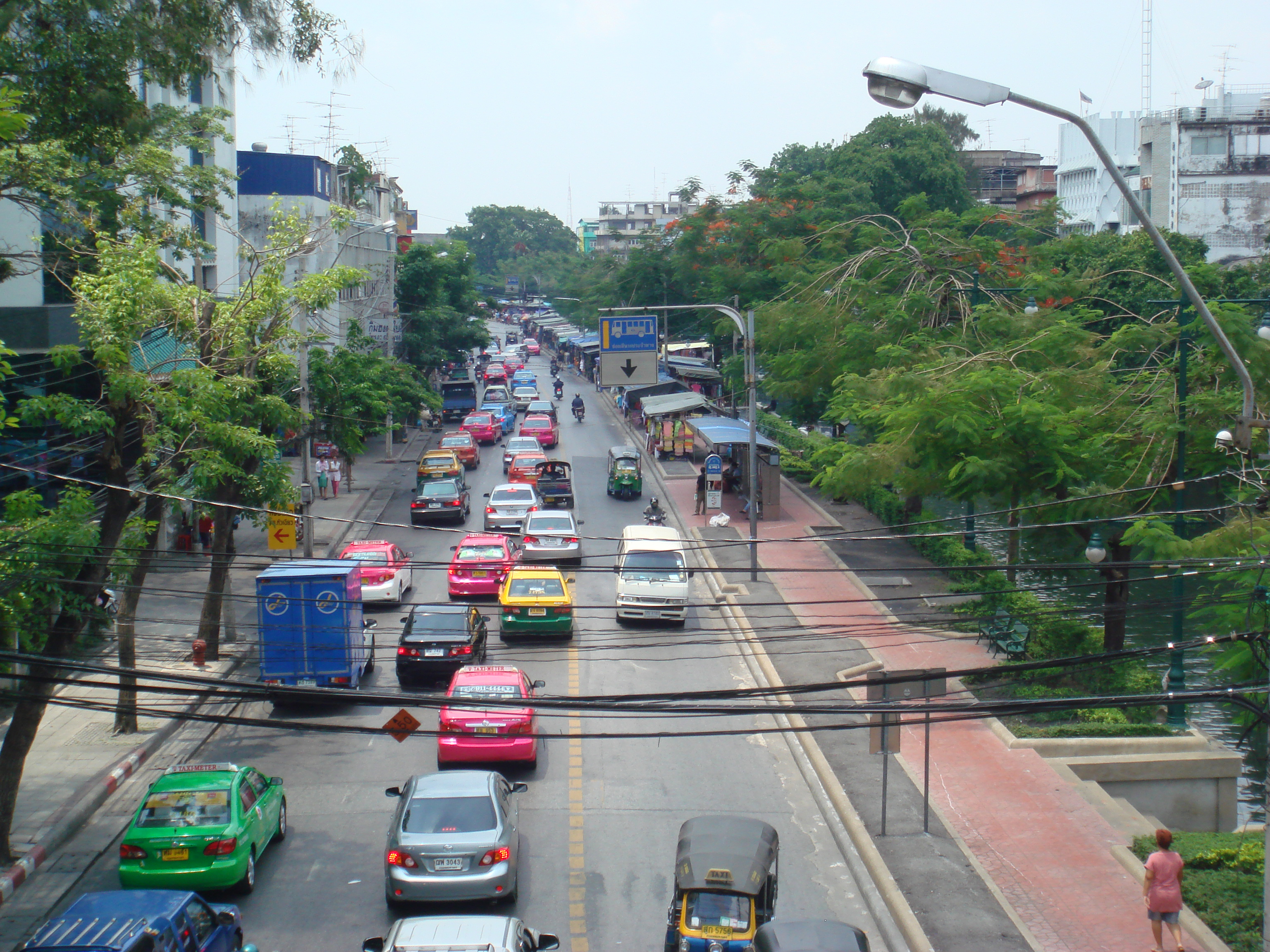
- Krung Kasem Road in the area of Bobae Market and parallel to the Khlong Phadung Krung Kasem

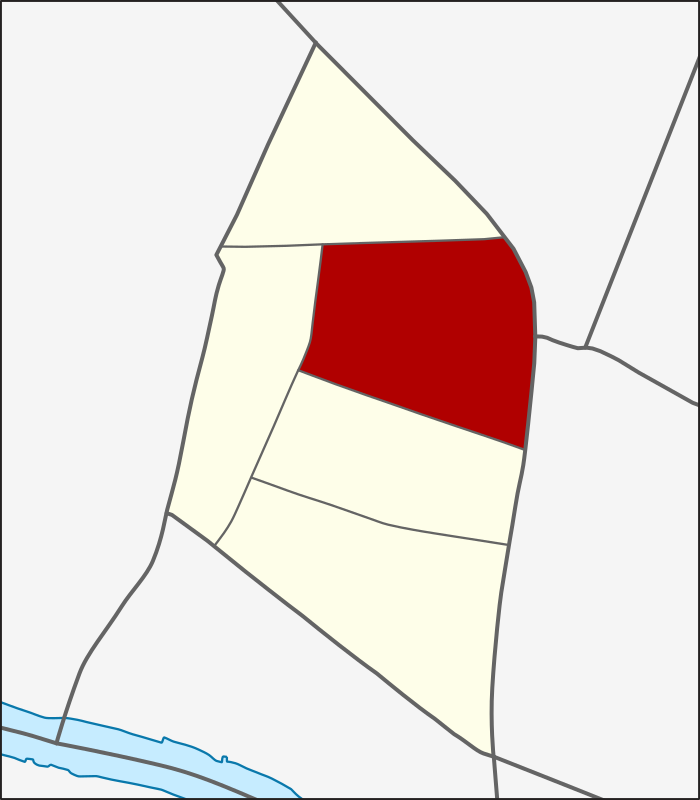
- Location in Pom Prap Sattru Phai District
- Country: Thailand
- Province: Bangkok
- Khet: Pom Prap Sattru Phai

Area
  - Total: 0.448 km^{2} (0.173 sq mi)

Population (2019)
  - Total: 9,128
- Time zone: UTC+7 (ICT)
- Postal code: 10100
- TIS 1099: 100803

Khlong Maha Nak (Thai: คลองมหานาค, pronounced [kʰlɔ̄ːŋ mā.hǎː nâːk]) is one of five khwaengs (subdistricts) of Pom Prap Sattru Phai District, Bangkok.

== Naming ==
It is named after the Khlong Maha Nak canal that flows through and bisects the area.

== Geography ==
Roads neighboring this subdistrict include (from the north clockwise): Lan Luang, Worachak, Bamrung Mueang, Krung Kasem.

Khlong Maha Nak, Khlong Phadung Krung Kasem, and Khlong Saen Saep are main watercourses. The Khlong Phadung Krung Kasem canal serves as the boundary between Si Yaek Maha Nak Subdistrict, Dusit District, and Rong Mueang Subdistrict, Pathum Wan District.

== Population ==
Total population of 9,482 people (4,473 men, and 5,009 women) most of the people are Muslims live in Masjid Maha Nak's neighbourhood by the Khlong Maha Nak.

== Places ==
- Hua Chiew Hospital
- Thonburi Bamrungmuang Hospital
- Masjid Maha Nak
- Bobae Market
- Bobae Tower
- Prince Palace Hotel
- Ministry of Social Development and Human Security
- Wat Sitaram
- Varadis Palace
