= National Council of Women of Thailand =

The National Council of Women of Thailand (NCWT), is a women's organization in Thailand, founded in 1957.

It was founded to function as an umbrella organization for the women's associations of Thailand. It was the first and the largest umbrella organization of women's rights in Thailand.
