= Si Yaek Maha Nak =

Coordinates: 13°45′28.64″N 100°30′59.12″E

Si Yaek Maha Nak สี่แยกมหานาค
- Khwaeng
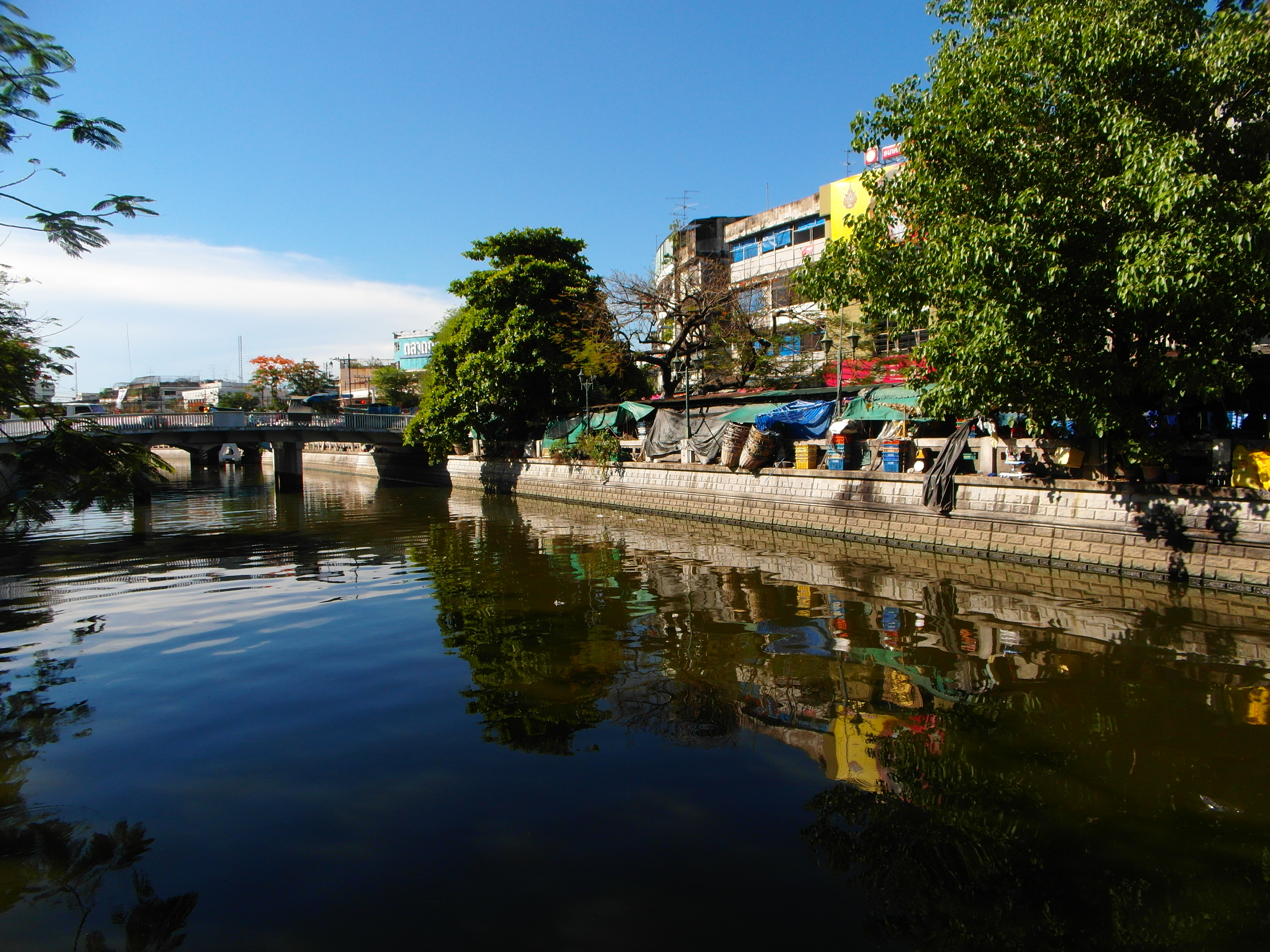
- Khlong Phadung Krung Kasem in the Khlong Maha Nak sub-district, Pom Prap Sattru Phai district, the opposite side is Mahanak Market in Si Yaek Maha Nak area

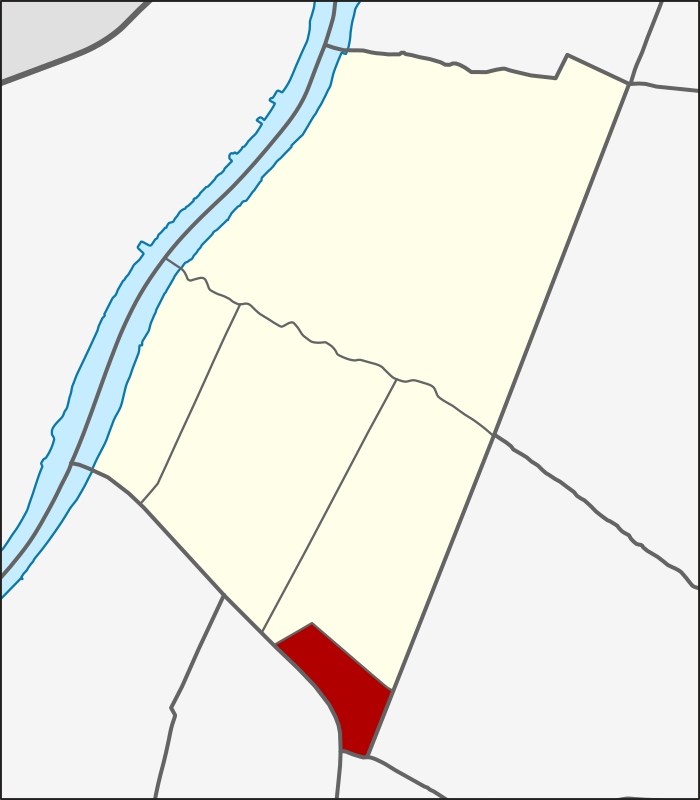
- Location in Dusit District
- Country: Thailand
- Province: Bangkok
- Khet: Dusit

Area
  - Total: 0.339 km^{2} (0.131 sq mi)

Population (2018)
  - Total: 7,422
  - Density: 21,893.81/km^{2} (56,704.7/sq mi)
- Time zone: UTC+7 (ICT)
- Postal code: 10300
- TIS 1099: 100204

Si Yaek Maha Nak (Thai: สี่แยกมหานาค, pronounced [sìː jɛ̂ːk mā.hǎː nâːk]) is a sub-district (khwaeng) of Dusit district, Bangkok.

== History ==
The name Si Yaek Maha Nak means "Maha Nak Intersection" or "Maha Nak Four Corner", as it's a water intersection. This area is famous for its past floating market. The name "Maha Nak" is named after Khlong Maha Nak. The canal has a starting point at the Khlong Rop Krung, part of the old city moat, from Mahat Thai Uthit Bridge near Ratchadamnoen Avenue and then Mahakan Fort passes through to the east. In this area it cuts across Khlong Phadung Krung Kasem and flowing continuously to Ban Khrua quarter, where it became Khlong Saen Saep. All of these canals were dug in the early Rattanakosin period during the reigns of King Phutthayotfa Chulalok (Rama I), Nangklao (Rama III) and Mongkut (Rama IV). It was the main transport route of the people in those days. It was the centre of travel and trade by boat and connected to Chachoengsao province by Khlong Saen Saep. It became a floating market at the end of that era.

One story behind this area's naming of "Si Yak Maha Nak", suggests that it is due to Mae Nak Phra Khanong, Thai female ghost, and was well known as being haunted by her inflating her body to a gigantic size here. And it's rumored that King Mongkut had visited to see her. (Maha is Thai loanword from Sanskrit महा (mahā) meaning the great).

At present, Si Yak Maha Nak remains an important marketplace, just as it was in the past. It is home to Maha Nak Market, also known as Saphan Khao Market, Bangkok's largest wholesale and retail fruit market. Additionally, it is adjacent to Bobae, a well-known wholesale and retail market for affordable clothing, located in Pom Prap Sattru Phai district.

== Geography ==
Neighbouring sub-districts are (from the north clockwise): Suan Chitlada in its district (Phitsanulok and Nakhon Sawan roads are the divider lines), Thanon Phetchaburi of Ratchathewi district (Northern railway line is a divider line), Rong Mueang of Pathum Wan district (Khlong Saen Saep is a divider line), Khlong Maha Nak and Wat Sommanat of Pom Prap Sattru Phai district (Khlong Phadung Krung Kasem is a divider line), respectively.

It has a total area of 0.375 km^{2} (round about 0.14 mi^{2}), considered as the smallest sub-district and the southernmost area of the district.

== Places ==
- Maha Nak Market or Saphan Khao Market
- Asia-Pacific International University: Bangkok Campus
- Hall of Honour of The Prime Ministers & The National Council of Women of Thailand Under The Royal Patronage of Her Majesty The Queen (formerly Ban Managkasila)
- Phitsanulok Mansion
- Bangkok Adventist Hospital (Mission Hospital)
