= Khlong =

Type of water canal in Thailand

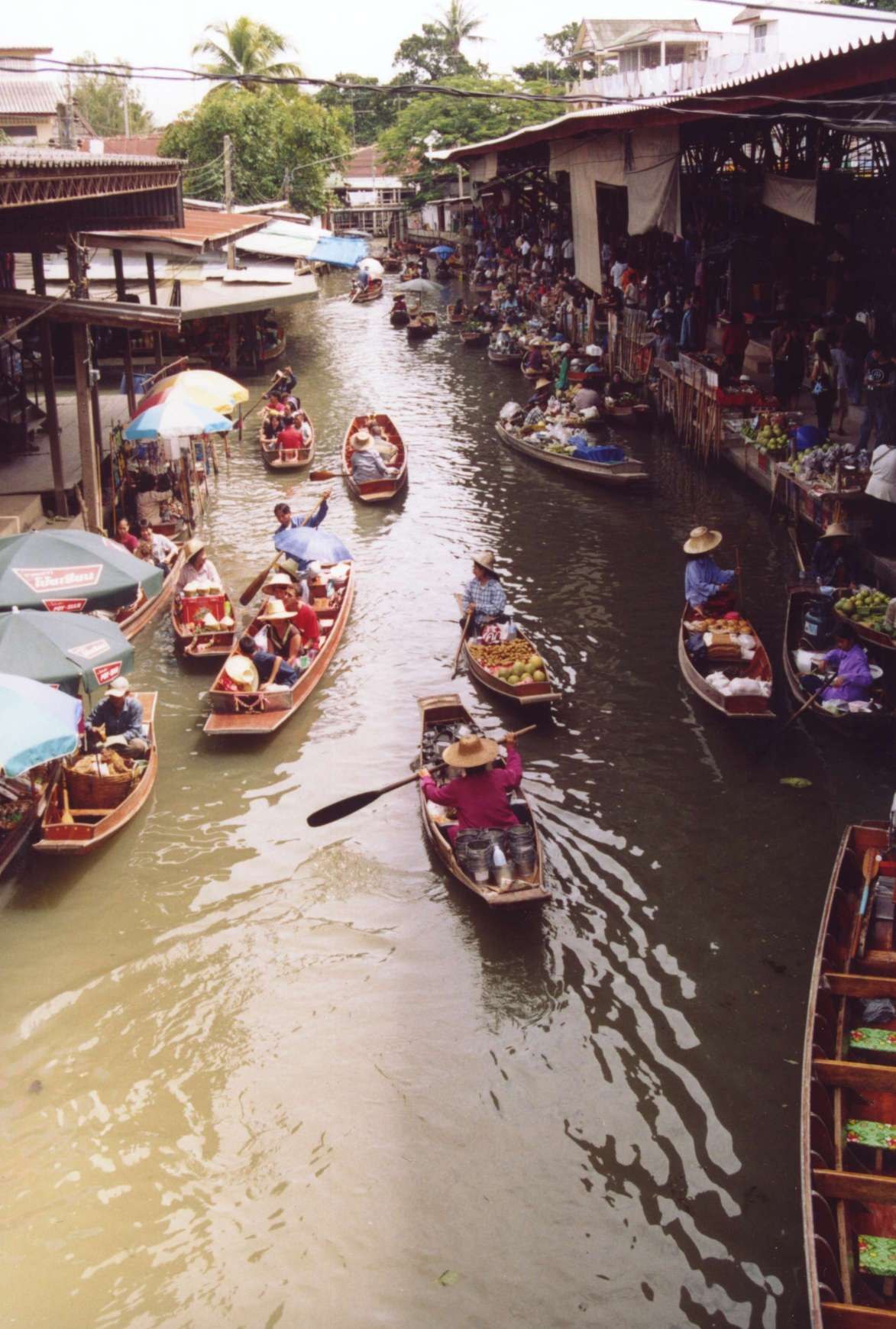
Damnoen Saduak floating market, Ratchaburi Province

A khlong (Thai: คลอง, pronounced [kʰlɔ̄ːŋ]), alternatively spelt klong (/ˈklɔːŋ/), is a type of canal found in Thailand. Khlongs are formed from the rivers Chao Phraya, Tha Chin, and Mae Klong, along with their tributaries, particularly in the low-lying areas of central Thailand. The Thai word khlong is not limited to artificial canals. Many smaller rivers are referred to as "khlong" followed by the name of the stream.

== Khlongs in Bangkok ==
As of 2019 there are 1,682 canals in Bangkok, totalling 2,604 kilometres in length. Nine canals are primary flood drainage conduits.

In earlier years, the Thai capital was crisscrossed by khlongs, and so gained the nickname "Venice of the East". Khlongs were used for transportation, for floating markets, and also for sewage disposal. Today, most of the khlongs of Bangkok have been filled in, although the Thonburi side of Bangkok (covering areas west of the Chao Phraya River) still retains several of its larger khlongs.

Khlong Saen Saep in central Bangkok is a significant thoroughfare in traffic-congested Bangkok's public transportation network.

== Floating markets ==
Traditional floating markets now exist mainly as tourist attractions. The best-known is the Damnoen Saduak floating market in Ratchaburi province.
