= Khlong Phadung Krung Kasem =

Canal in Bangkok, Thailand

Coordinates: 13.7477°N 100.5167°E

Phadung Krung Kasem
- Khlong Phadung Krung Kasem near the Hua Lamphong railway station
- Location: Bangkok
- Country: Thailand

Specifications
- Length: 5.5 km (3.4 miles)
- Locks: 2

History
- Former names: Khlong Phadung
- Principal engineer: Somdet Chao Phraya Borom Maha Sri Suriwongse
- Date approved: 1851
- Construction began: 1851
- Date of first use: 1852
- Date completed: 1852

Geography
- Direction: south
- Start point: Chao Phraya River in Khwaeng Wat Sam Phraya, Khet Phra Nakhon and Khwaeng Wachira Phayaban, Khet Dusit
- End point: Chao Phraya River in Khwaeng Talat Noi, Khet Samphanthawong and Khwaeng Bang Rak, Khet Bang Rak
- Branch of: Chao Phraya River
- Connects to: Chao Phraya River

Khlong Phadung Krung Kasem (Thai: คลองผดุงกรุงเกษม, pronounced [kʰlɔ̄ːŋ pʰā.dūŋ krūŋ kā.sěːm]) is a canal (khlong) in Bangkok. It was dug in 1851 in order to serve as a new outer moat for the expanding city, extending its boundaries from the Rattanakosin Island to the north and east.

== History ==
When the city of Rattanakosin (the formal name of the capital city today known as Bangkok) was founded by King Phutthayotfa Chulalok (Rama I) in 1782, it was set within fortified walls, and Khlong Rop Krung was constructed as a moat to protect the city's eastern flank. The Chao Phraya River formed a natural barrier to the west. By the time of King Mongkut (Rama IV)'s reign, the city had outgrown its original area, and in 1851 the King ordered the digging of another canal, roughly parallel to the old moat, from Wat Thewarat Kunchon to Wat Kaeo Fa. The construction, headed by Chaophraya Si Suriyawong, was completed the following year, and the King named the canal Khlong Phadung Krung Kasem, roughly meaning "the canal upholding the city's happiness". As the political climate and military practices had vastly changed by then, defensive walls were no longer deemed necessary, although seven forts were nevertheless built along the canal (plus one on the western bank opposite the canal's mouth). The expansion more than doubled the city area, to 5,552 rai (8.883 km^{2}; 3.430 sq mi).

== Route ==
The canal is 5.5 km (3.4 mi) long. It begins at its mouth on the Chao Phraya River near Thewet Pier in Phra Nakhon District, flows along the boundary between Dusit District and Pom Prap Sattru Phai District, and intersects with Khlong Maha Nak at Bobae, where the two waterways form a four-way intersection, before continuing southward to the Chao Phraya River at Si Phraya Pier, on the boundary between Bang Rak District and Samphanthawong District. There are roads running parallel to the canal along both banks, with Luk Luang Road on the northern side and Krung Kasem Road on the southern side. Both roads were constructed during the King Chulalongkorn (Rama V)'s reign.

=== Gallery ===
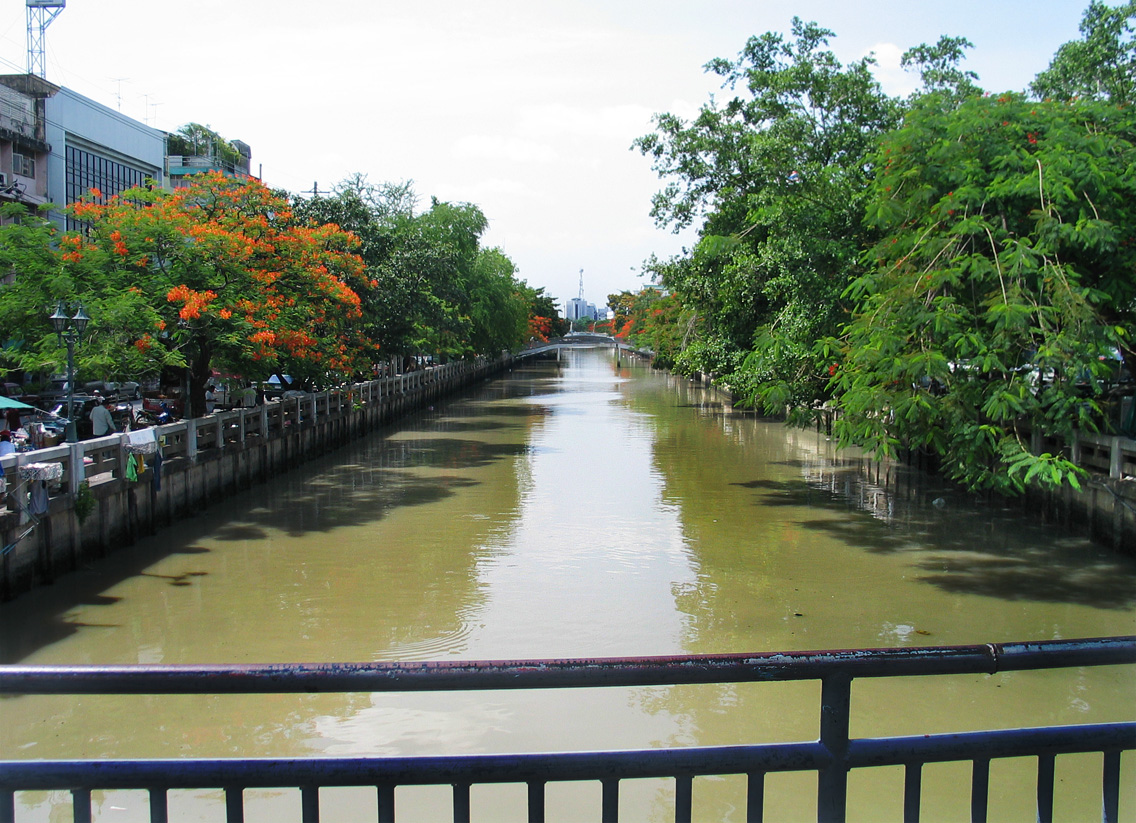
View along Khlong Padung Krung Kasem

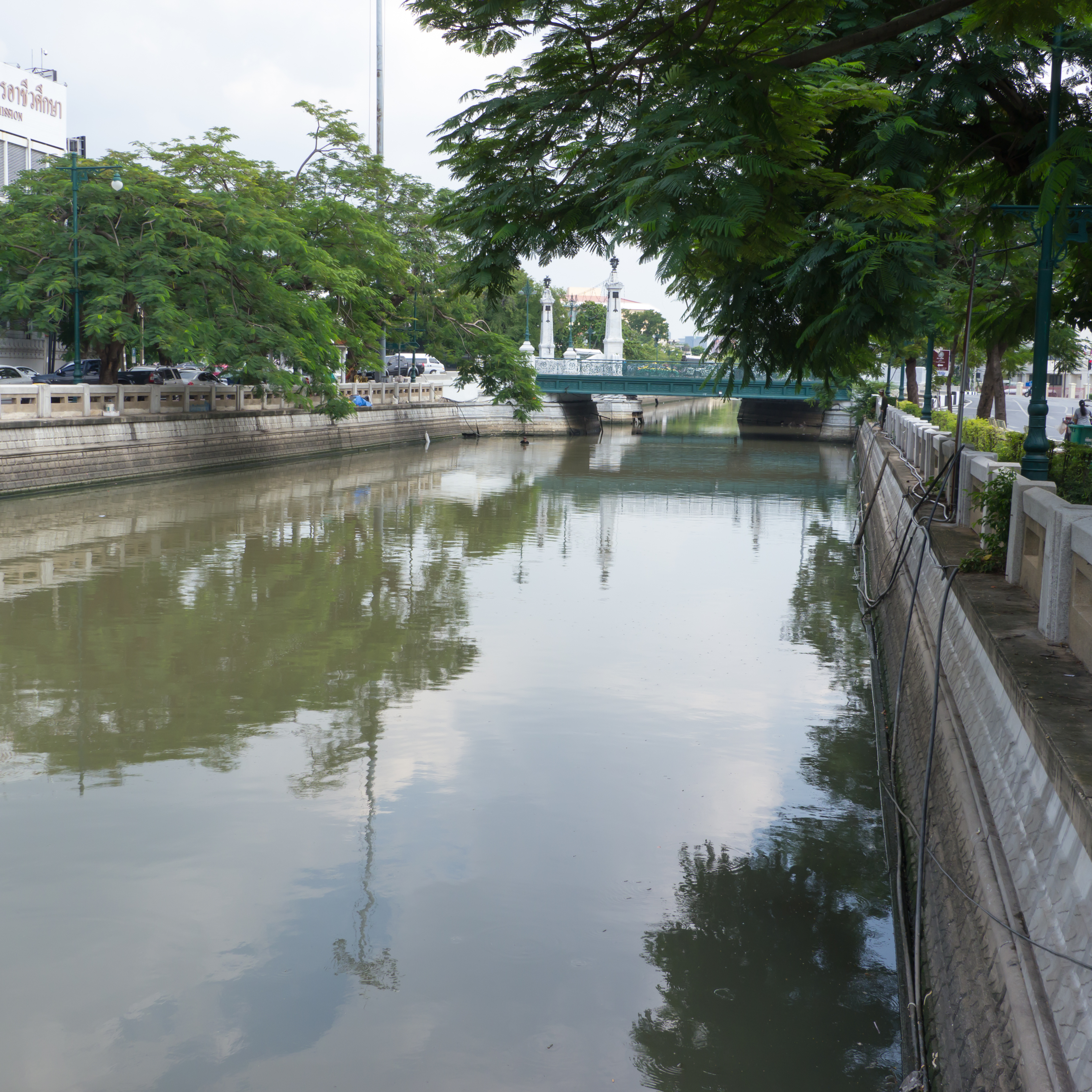
View along Khlong Padung Krung Kasem

== See also ==
- History of Bangkok
- Fortifications of Bangkok
