= Bairagi Brahmin (caste) =

Caste in India

Vaishnav Brahmin
- Swami • Vaishnav • Mahant
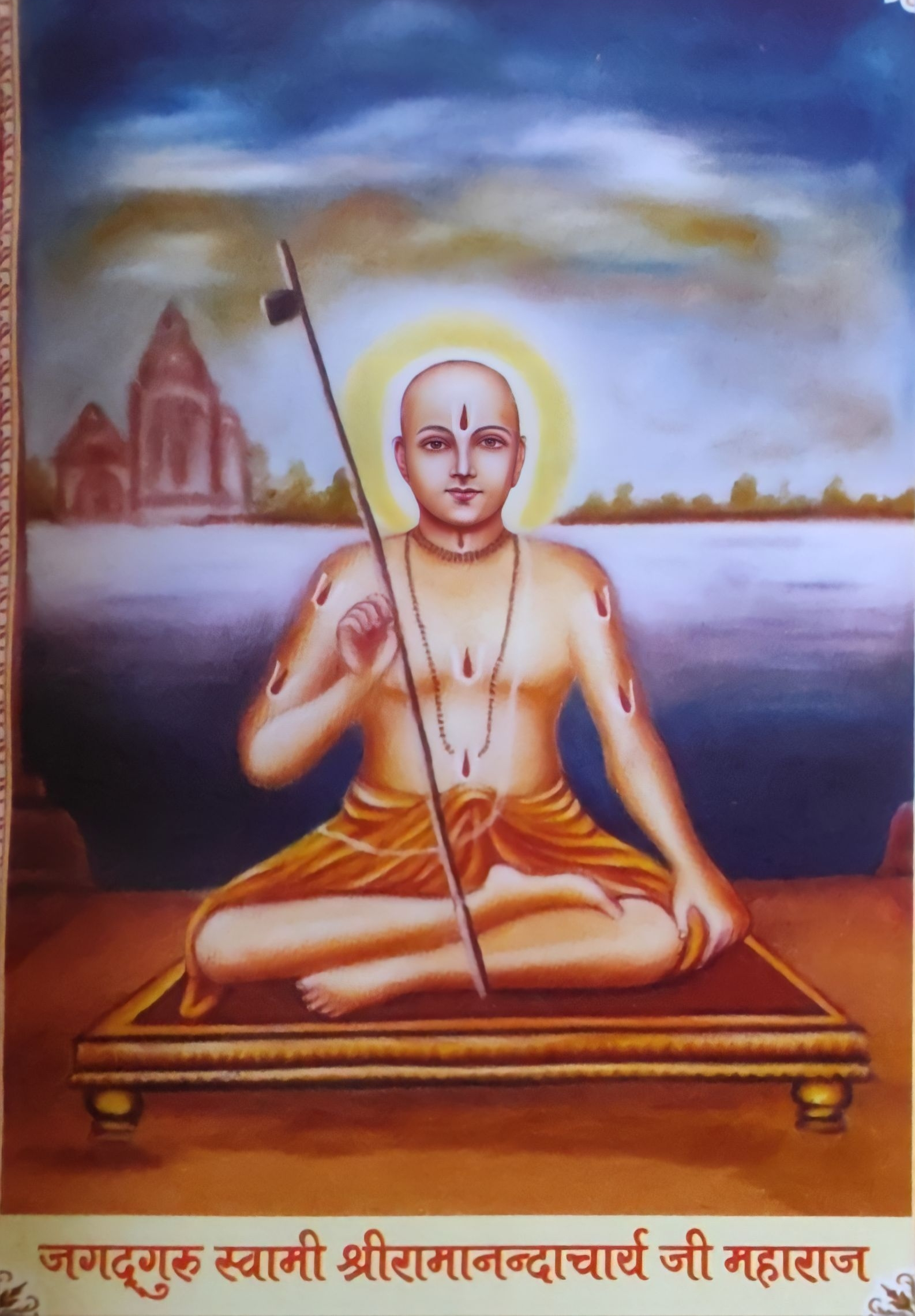
- Ramananda
- Varna: Brahmin
- Classification: Ramanandi Sampradaya • Nimbarka Sampradaya • Vishnuswami Sampradaya • Madhvacharya Sampradaya
- Kuladevta (male): Rama • Krishna • Satyanarayana • (Avatars of Vishnu) • Hanuman
- Kuladevi (female): Sita • Radha • Rukmini • Tulsi • Bhudevi • (Avatars of Lakshmi)
- Guru: Ramananda • Tulsidas • Nabha Dass • Ramanuja • Krishnadas Payahari
- Nishan: Kapidhwaj (Hanuman on Flag)
- Religions: Hinduism
- Languages: Hindi • Awadhi • Bhojpuri • Braj Bhasha • Maithili • Magahi • Angika • Bajjika • Nagpuri • Tharu • Bagheli • Bundeli • Kannauji • Kauravi • Haryanvi • Bagri• Gujarati • Assamese • Punjabi • Kumaoni • Garhwali • Western Pahari • Rajasthani • Marwari • Mewari • Malvi • Shekhawati • Dhundari • Hadoti • Nimadi • Chhattisgarhi • Odia • Bengali • Marathi • Kokborok • Tamil • Kannada • Telugu
- Country: India • Nepal
- Populated states: India; Uttar Pradesh • Bihar • Gujarat • Rajasthan • Haryana • Jharkhand • Madhya Pradesh • Himachal Pradesh • Uttarakhand • Rajasthan • Punjab • Maharastra • Chhattisgarh • Odisha • West Bengal • Haryana • Karnataka • Tamil Nadu • Telangana • Andhra Pradesh • Tripura; Nepal; Madhesh • Lumbini
- Feudal title: Mahant/Swami/Bawa
- Color: Saffron, red, yellow, or white
- Historical grouping: Brahmin
- Status: Monasterial Community

Bairagi Brahmin or Vaishnav Bairagi or Vaishnav Brahmin is a Hindu caste. They are Hindu priests. They are sedentary rasik (temple dwelling or temple priest) Brahmin members of the Vaishnava sampradayas, especially the Ramanandi Sampradaya. According to K.S. Singh, the community uses different surnames/titles in different states and union territories of India; these are: Swami, Bairagi, Mahanta, Maharaj, Vaishnav, Bawa, Pandit, Purohit, Goswami, Sharma, Das, Adhikari, Brahmachari. They are Vaishnav, and wear the sacred thread. A majority of Bairagi Brahmin is found in Uttar Pradesh, Bihar, Jharkhand, Gujarat, Rajasthan, West Bengal, Assam, and Odisha. Vaishnavas are considered to be part of the 'upper castes' of India.

== Vaishnav Sect and Vaishnav Brahmin Caste ==
=== Vaishnav Sect ===
Members of Vaishnava sampradayas are called Bairagi or Vairagi. And these members are divided into three categories – renunciant (Virakt), warrior (Naga) and temple-dwelling (temple priest) ascetics. The most of renunciant and warrior are unmarried ascetics. Anyone can be member of these communities. But there are evidences of different meetings of vaishnava mahants who have decided that member of anyone caste could not be member of the community.

"Decision was taken by all the vaishnava mahants that no one would be member of the community except Brahmin and Kshatriya. And other castes excluded from the community." – Galta Temple Meeting, 1713.

Another case was of Maharaja Jai Singh II, king of Jaipur State held a meeting with all Vaishnavas mahants.

"Decision was taken that other castes would not be part of bairagis except Brahmin and Kshatriya." – Meeting of Maharaja Jai Singh II with Ramanandi mahants and other vaishnava to maintain strict caste rules, 1720.

Maharaja Jai Singh II obtained pledges from Ramanandi mahants and other vaishnava to maintain strict caste rules.

Senugupta describes them as a High caste group. According to H.A. Rose, in the Punjab and Haryana, most of Bairagis were recruited from Jats. Bairagi Sect in bengal is mainly formed by Poundra, Kayastha, Rajbanshi Castes in Gaudiya Sampradaya.

Vaishnavas were liberals but in the practice Brahmin Vaishnavas (Vaishnava Brahmins) took food only from another Brahmins.

William Pinch believes that the Bairagi branch of Vaishnavas is the result of the Bhakti Movement in 1000th CE.

=== Bairagi Brahmin Caste ===
Bairagi Brahmin caste is formed of sedentary rasik (temple dwelling or temple priest) Brahmin members of the vaishnava sampradayas especially the Ramanandi Sampradaya. They are the members of vaishnava sampradayas. They are married and they have families. And rights of priesthood pass to their descendants. It is found that Bairagi Brahmins are priest in the most of villages and cities.

According to Mayer, Status of Bairagis is equal with other Brahmins.

== Structure of Bairagi Brahmins ==
Bairagi brahmins are divided into four Sampradayas - often referred to collectively as the 'Chatur-Sampradaya'. 1. Rudra Sampradaya (Vishnuswami), 2. Sri Sampradaya (Ramanandi), 3. Nimbarka Sampradaya and 4. Brahma Sampradaya (Madhvacharya).

== Akharas ==
There are three prominent Bairagi (Vaishnav) Akharas:

- Digambar Akhara
- Nirmohi Akhara
- Nirvani Akhara

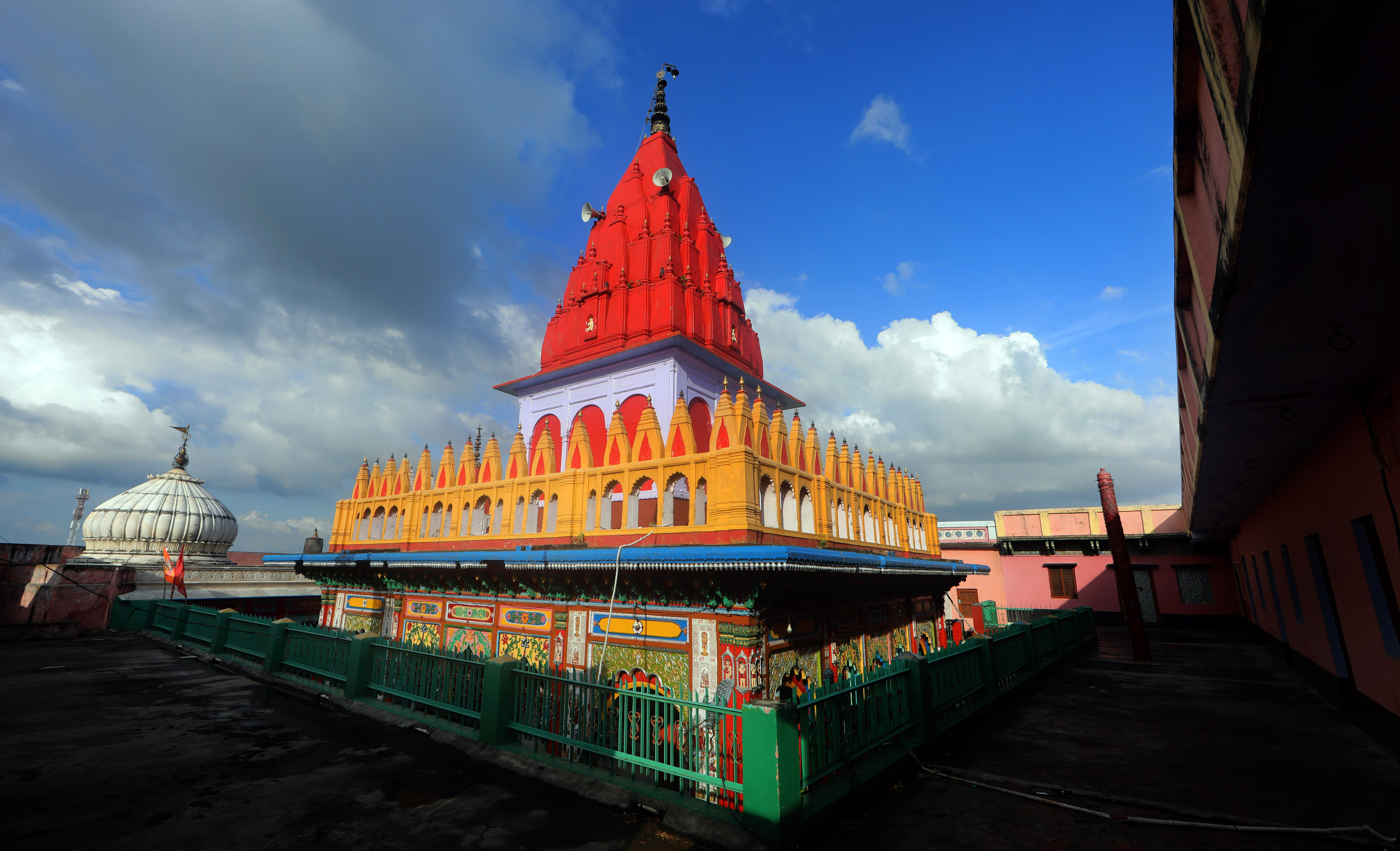
Hanuman Garhi Temple, a major site of Ramanandi Bairagis in Ayodhya, Uttar Pradesh.

== Mahabharat ==
The Mahabharata says that once, after Babruvahana dug a dry pond, a Bairagi Brahmin reached the centre of pond and instantly water came out of the pond with a thunderous noise.
