= Mahant (disambiguation) =

A mahant is a religious superior in Hindu religious establishments or groups. It is a title (surname) of Bairagi.

Mahant or Mahanta may also refer to:

- Mahanta (moth)
- Mahanta quadrilinea
- Mahant, a ruler of the princely state Chhuikhadan State
- Mahant, a ruler of the princely state Nandgaon State
- Mahant Balaknath
- Mahant Shreyonath
- Mahanta Mohanananda Brahmachari
- Mahanta (Last name)

== People with the given name ==
- Mahant Avaidyanath (1921–2014), Indian politician and Hindu preacher
- Mahant Chandnath (1956–2017), Indian politician and religious leader
- Mahant Swami Maharaj (born 1933), Indian Hindu religious leader
- Vaishnavi Mahant (born 1974), Indian actress

== People with the surname ==
- Adikanda Mahanta (born 1954), Indian folklorist
- Angarag Mahanta, Indian singer, known by his stage name Papon
- Bhaskar Jyoti Mahanta, Indian police officer and former DGP of Assam
- Charan Das Mahant (born 1954), Indian politician
- Heerak Jyoti Mahanta (died 1991), Indian Assamese separatist
- Joyasree Goswami Mahanta (born 1960), Indian politician
- Keshab Mahanta (born 1959), Indian politician
- Khagen Mahanta (19442–2014), Indian singer
- Mitradev Mahanta (1894–1983), Indian writer, dramatist, historical researcher, freedom fighter, and actor
- Prafulla Kumar Mahanta, Indian politician
- Urmila Mahanta, Indian actress

== See also ==
- Mahaanta, Indian film
