= Purohita =

Family priest

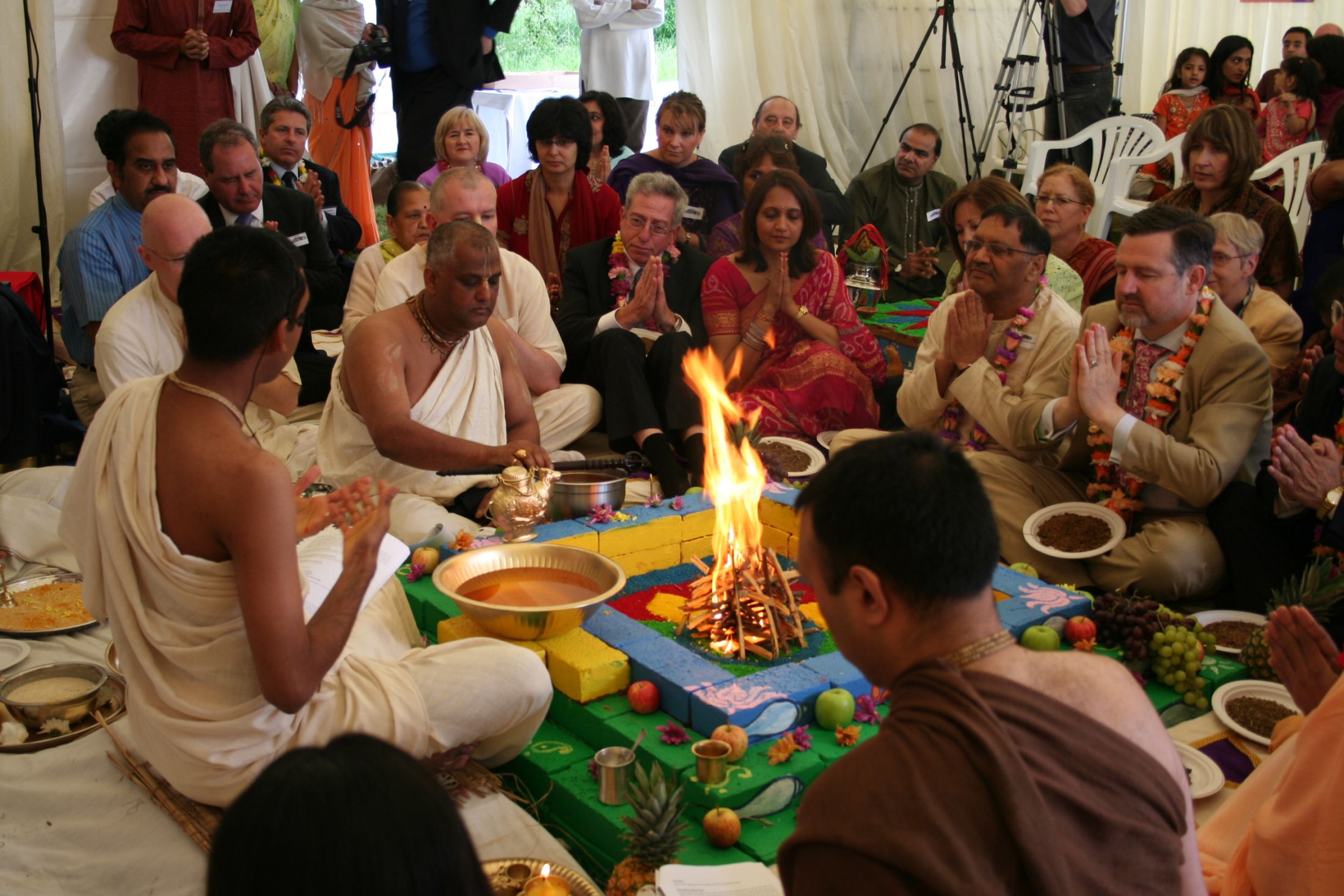
Purohitas engaging in a yajna

Purohita (Sanskrit: पुरोहित), in the Hindu context, means chaplain or family priest within the Vedic priesthood. In Thailand and Cambodia, it refers to the royal chaplains.

== Etymology ==
The word purohita derives from the Sanskrit, puras meaning "front", and hita, "placed". The word is also used synonymously with the word pandit, which also means "priest". Tirtha purohita means the purohita who sit at the fords of the holy rivers or holy tanks and who have maintained the records of the forefathers of the Hindu family for thousands of years. Purohita can refer to a house priest. Another less-formal name for teerth purohits is panda, which is derived from the word pandit (from the Sanskrit paṇḍita, meaning "learned man").

== Education ==
In India, literate men from the Brahmin varna who desire to become purohitas receive special training both in theory and practice in Vedic schools linked to agraharams, inherited from royal grants to train and sustain chaplains historically maintained by dynasties such as the Cholas and Pallavas.

In fact, special training is required to perform yajna and yagadi rituals. For this, knowledge of the Vedas is required. In order to learn those rituals, one must settle down as courtiers in famous temples. Temples like Tirupati, Simhachalam or Chathapuram Agraharam run Vedic schools to teach wisdom to the aspiring purohita. Chathapuram Agraharam in Kalpathi. Moreover, by joining as disciples of eminent scholars, some learn this education in the manner of gurus.

Training follows the rhythm of mandatory regular prayer or Sandhyavandanam. The candidates are first trained in the Vigneswara Puja. Cantillation and preaching are also part of the formation. This initial formation takes at least one year. After that, it takes another five to eight years to learn to rich array of rites of passage or Shodasha rituals.

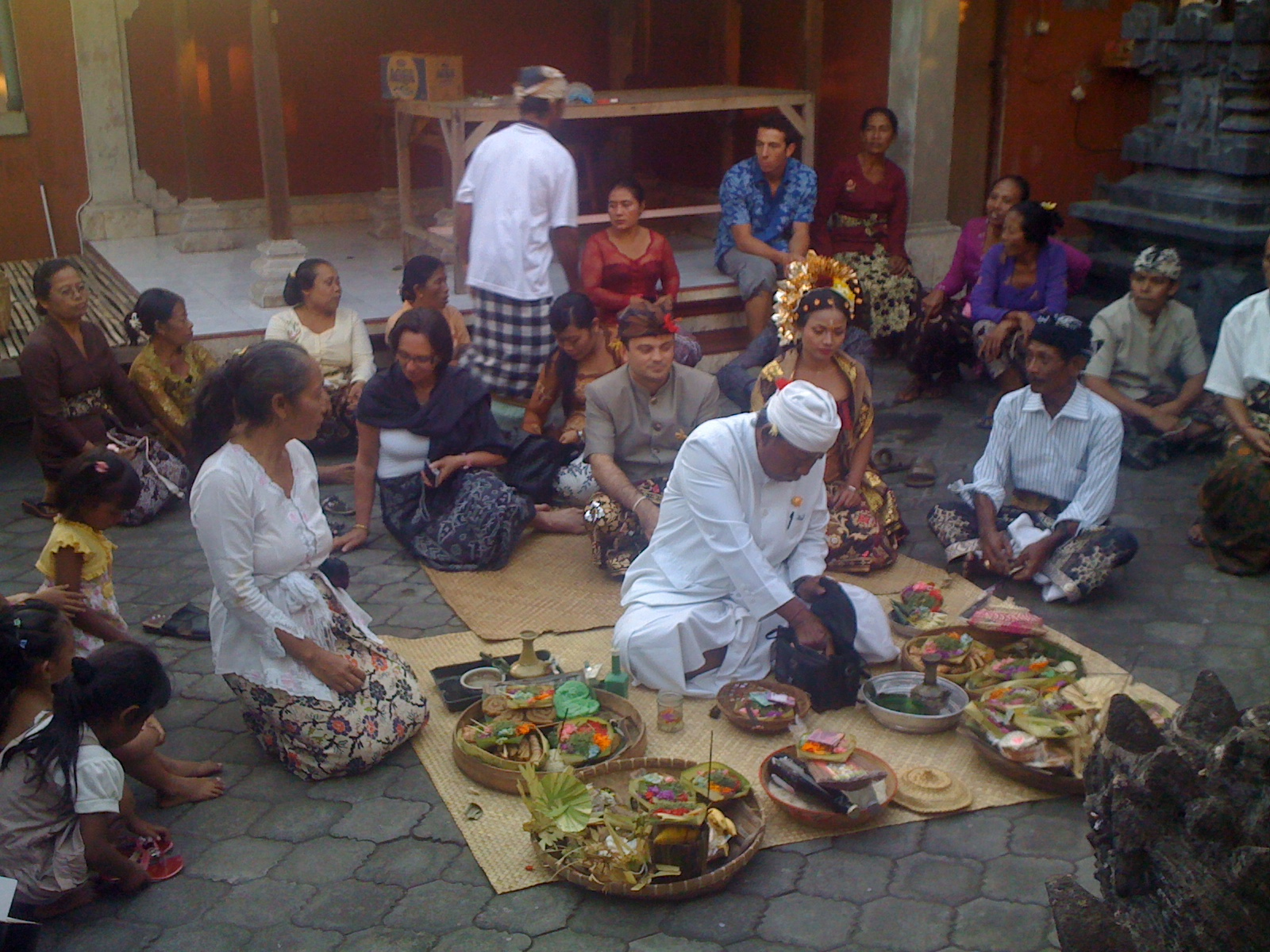
A purohita performing at a Balinese wedding

== Duties ==
The duties of the purohita is to perform rites or yajna and Vedic sacrifices such as ashvamedha in favour of a sponsor.

Since Vedic times the sponsor of the sacrifice, or yajamāna was only a distant participant while the hotṛ or brahman took his stead in the ritual. In this seconding lay the origins of the growing importance of the purohita (literally, "one who is placed in front"). The purohita offered sacrifices in the name of his sponsor, besides conducting other more domestic (gṛhya) rituals for him also. The purohita can mediate for his sponsor "even to the extent of bathing or fasting for him" and the purohita in some ways becomes a member of the family.

The purohita is traditionally a hereditary charge linked to a royal dynasty, a noble family, a group of families, or a village. As one purohita is tied to a certain family of number of families, the division among a new generation of the duties of a first purohita has sometimes given rise to conflicts. Thus, in 1884, a hereditary purohita whose right had been contested by his older brother was given right to officiate in his village as well as damages and fees by the Appellate Civil Court in India.

A tīrthapurohita is a priest/ritual performer (purohita) at a sacred site (tīrtha).

== History and geography ==
=== India ===
==== Origin ====
Rajapurohita was an ancient term for a priest who acted for royalty, carrying out rituals and providing advice. In this sense, it is synonymous with rajaguru. Hermann Kulke and Dietmar Rothermund note that, "there is much evidence in ancient texts that there were two ideal types of Brahmanas in those days, the royal priest (rajapurohita) or advisor (rajaguru) and the sage (rishi) who lived in the forest and shared his wisdom only with those who asked for it." They are generally found in the states of Rajasthan, Uttar Pradesh, Bihar, Jharkhand, Uttarkhand, Madhya Pradesh, West Bengal, Gujarat, Punjab, Haryana, and Himachal Pradesh. The term's modern use in this sense has been described by Sumit Sarkar as a "self-conscious archaism".

The violent scriptural conflict between Vasishtha and Vishvamitra, two of the most famous prelates of the Vedic age, for the post of purohita in the court of king Sudas, show how much importance was attached to the office in those days.

==== Decline ====
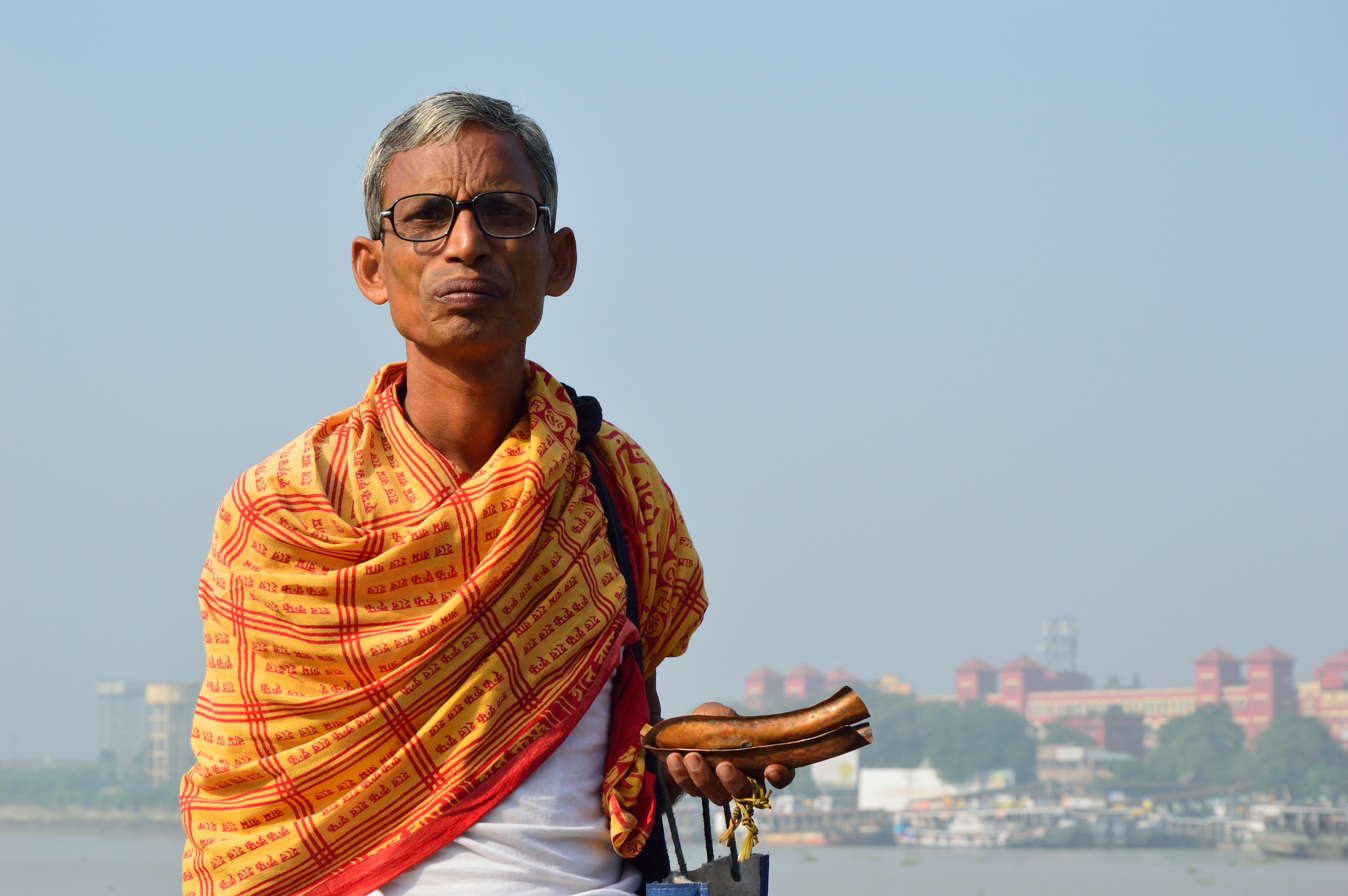
A tirtha purohita at the Ram Chandra Goenka Zenana Bathing Ghat, Kolkata

The office of purohita was one of great honour in the Vedic times in India, but by the end of 19th century it had become insignificant.

In the 1970s, the purohita had been reduced to "rudimentary religious tasks". Along with the loss of the privy purse, the Maharajas of India lost their princely status and the role of the purohita as royal chaplains declined even more.

To this day, however, the Pareeks claim to be descendants of the purohitas of the Rajas and Maharajas. Since the 1990s, various attempts to renew the Vedic priesthood and the role of the purohita have come from both traditional Vedic temples as well as new movements such as "New Age Purohit Darpan" by the Bengalis to the Bengali diaspora.

=== Southeast Asia ===
Brahmins still serve as royal chaplains and conduct the royal ceremonies in Southeast Asian countries where the monarchy had been maintained.

==== Cambodia ====
Khmer legends refer to Java Brahmins coming to Kambujadesa. A Brahmin called Hiranyadama was sent from India to teach Tantric rites to Sivakaivalya whose family honoured the post of Royal purohita for nearly 250 years.

Ties between the brahmanic lineage from India and the Khmer dynasty were reinforced by bonds of marriage: Indian Brahmin Agatsya married Yasomati, and Duvakara was wedded to Indralakshmi, daughter of king Rajendravarman.

Thus, Sivasoma, the purohita who served as royal chaplain to Indravarman and Yasovarman I was also the grandson of King Jayendradhipativarman and the maternal uncle of Jayavarman II. Sivasoma oversaw the construction of Phnom Bakheng at Angkor, a Hindu temple in the form of a temple mountain, dedicated to Shiva.

Another important purohita was Sarvajnamuni, a brahmin who had left India "to gain the favours of Shiva by coming to Cambodia", and became the purohita of Jayavarman VIII whom he led in the "Shaivite reaction", an iconoclastic movement was directed towards the monuments of Jayavarman VII.

The Brahminical rituals were reinstated in Cambodia after the overthrow of the Khmer Rouge.

==== Myanmar ====
The Brahmins of Myanmar have historically provided reading of the futures of the king they are serving. They lost their role due to the abolition of monarchy with the deposing of king Thibaw, but continues to engage in fortune telling.

==== Thailand ====
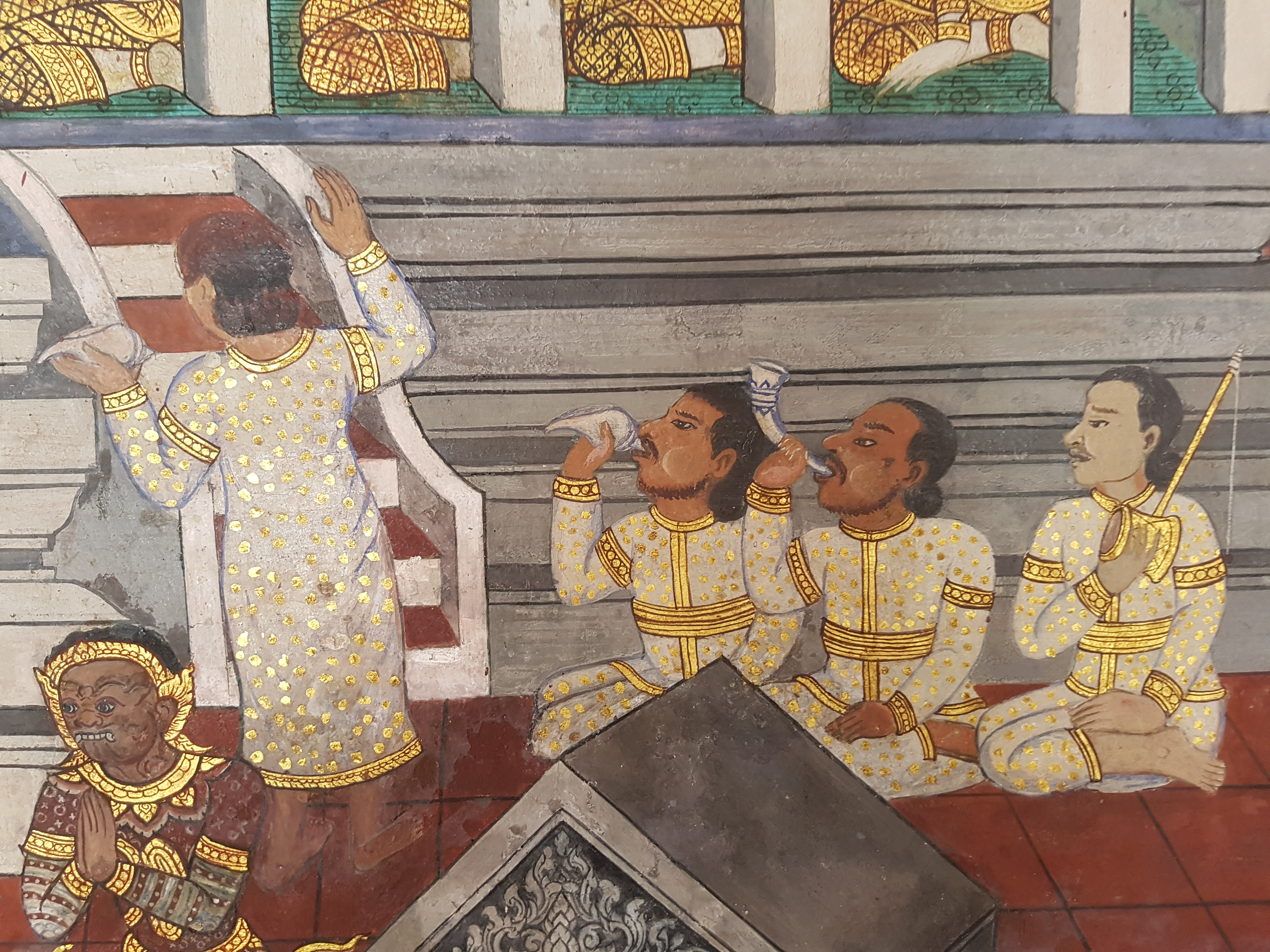
Royal Brahmins performing a ceremony, mural painting from Temple of Emerald Buddha

Thailand has two ethnic Thai Brahmin communities-Brahm Luang (Royal Brahmins) and Brahm Chao Baan (folk Brahmins). All ethnic Thai Brahmins are Buddhist by religions, who still worship Hindu deities. The Brahm Luang (Royal Brahmins) mainly perform royal ceremonies for the Thai King, including crowning of the king. They belong to the long family bloodline of Brahmins in Thailand, who originated from Tamil Nadu. The Brahm Chao Baan or folk Brahmins are the category of Brahmins who are not from a bloodline of priests. Generally, these Brahmins have a small knowledge about the rituals and ceremonies. The Devasathan is the centre of Brahmin activity in Thailand. This is where the Triyampawai ceremony is conducted, which is a Tamil Shaiva ritual. It was built more than 200 years ago. Apart from this there are also Indian Brahmins from India who migrated to Thailand more recently.

Though it is believed that the Brahmins serving the court and residing at the Devasathan temple come from Rameswaram, Tamil Nadu, Prince historian Damrong Rajanubhab has mentioned about three kind of Brahmins, from Nakhon Si Thammarat, from Phatthalung, and those who originated from Cambodia.
