= Triyampawai ceremony =

Hindu ritual

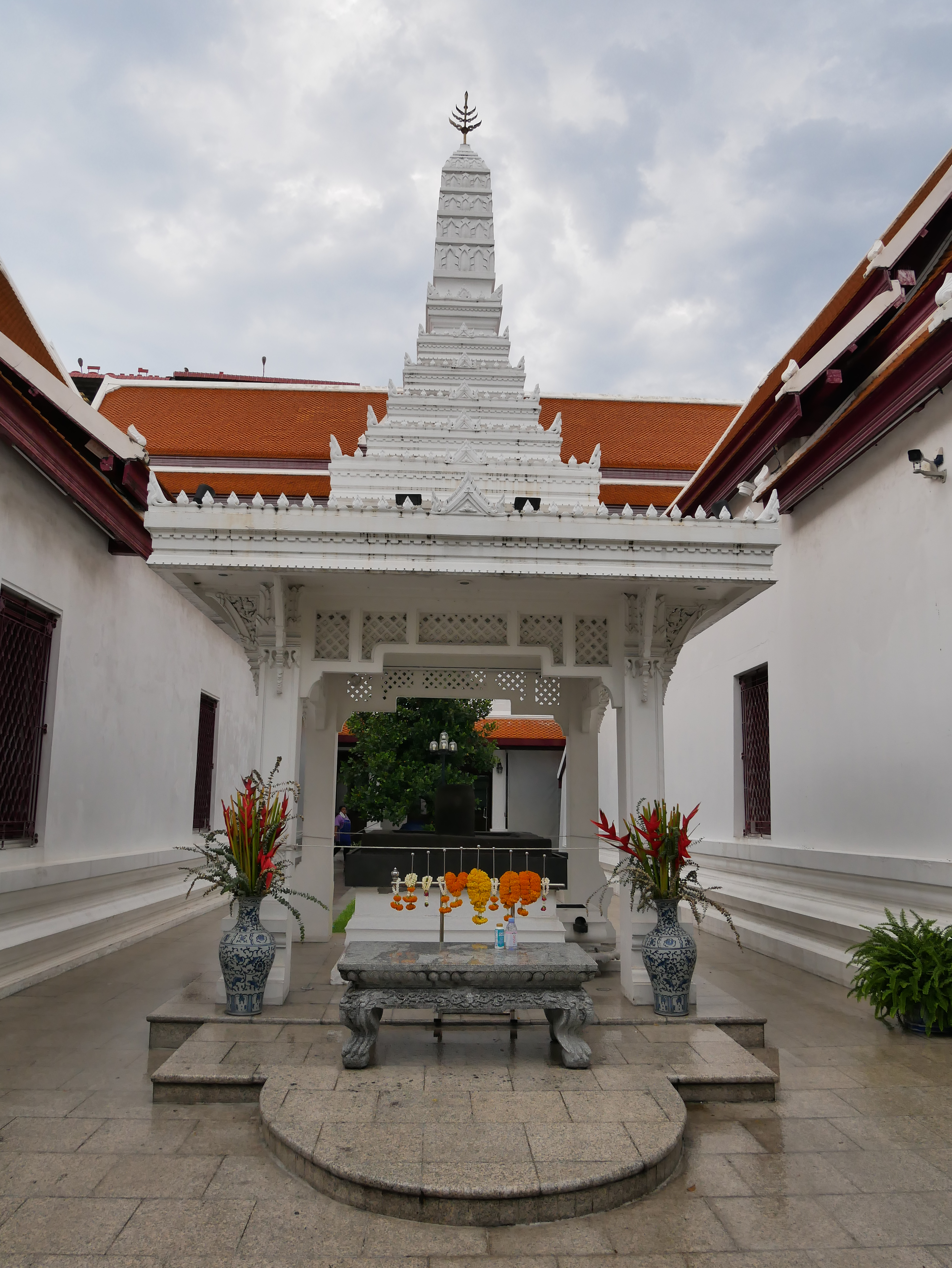
The Devasathan, the royal Brahmin temple and the present annual venue of the Triyamphway ceremony

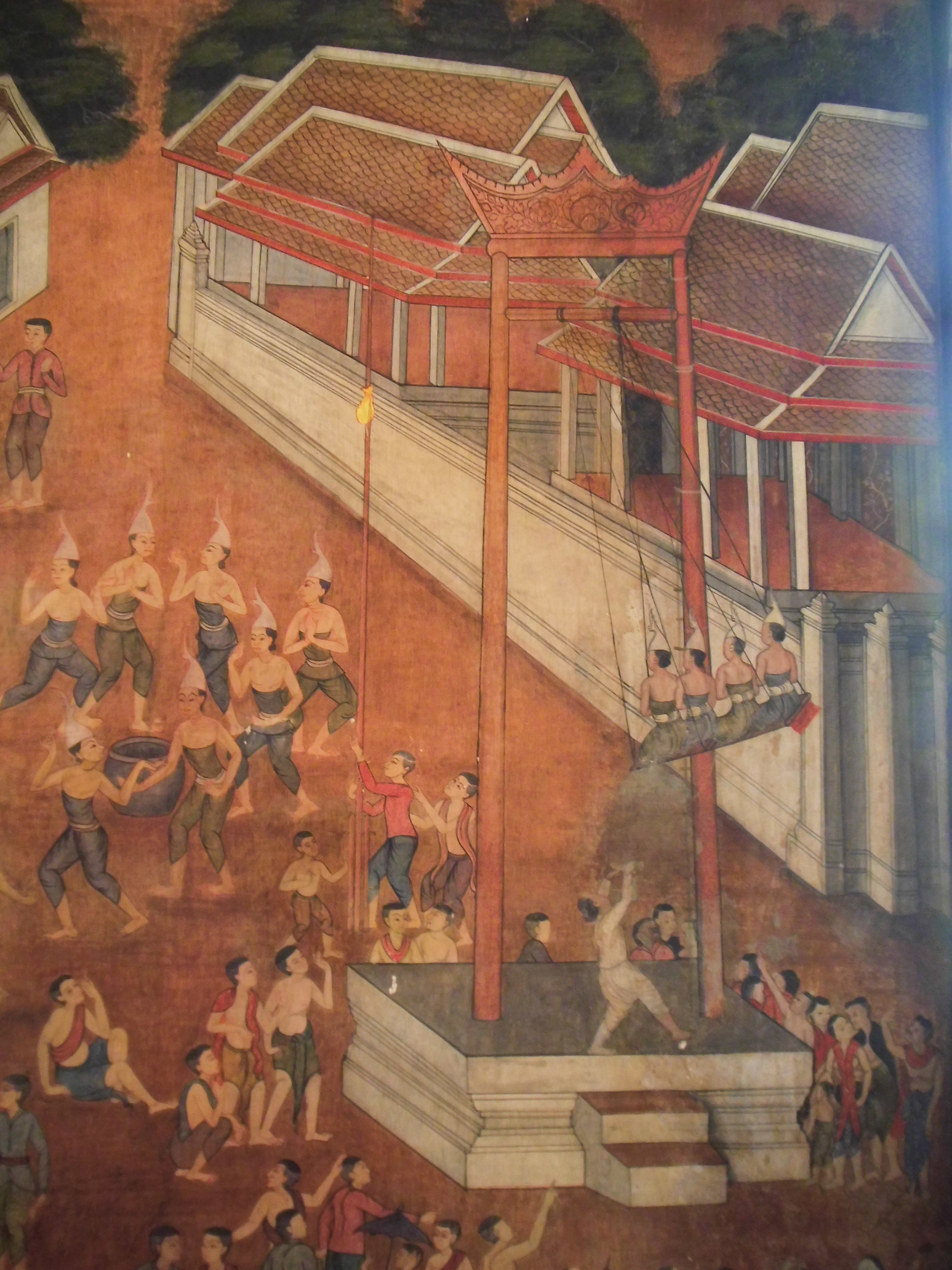
A mural depicting the "swing ceremony" at Wat Senasanaram, Phra Nakhon Si Ayutthaya province

The Triyampawai Ceremony (Thai: พระราชพิธีตรียัมปวาย; RTGS: phra ratcha phithi triyampawai, (Note: ตรียัมปวาย is the spelling used in the Dictionary of the Thai Language by the Royal Society of Thailand. Other historical Thai variants include: ตรียำปวาย (RTGS: triyampawai, used in Monthienban), ตรียำพวาย (RTGS: triyamphawai, used in the Three Seals Law), and ตรียัมพวาย (RTGS: triyamphawai, used in King Chulalongkorn's Royal Ceremonies of the Twelve Months).) lit. 'royal ceremony Triyampawai') is a Hindu ritual currently celebrated at the Devasathan in Bangkok. It was formerly one of the twelve monthly royal ceremonies of the Thai court and is identified with the Tamil Thiruvempavai tradition.

== History ==
It is believed that Thiruvembavai was introduced to Thailand by Tamils who immigrated to then Siam in 14th century CE. Available historical evidences confirm that the ritual of Thiruvembavai has been observed at Ayutthaya, Sukhothai, and Sawankhalok, the ancient capitals of Thailand. Initially it was observed as a penance and fasting at Sawankhalok and Phitsanulok, and later it got royal patronage and became one of the 12 royal ceremonies combined with the swing ceremony.

== Rituals ==
Triyamphway was celebrated to praise the Hindu god Siwa, who was believed to come visit Thailand at the end of every Thai year. He was offered with rice, fruits, and vegetables. Great Swing ceremony was celebrated to make him happy at the well known Sao Chingcha. So many Thai folklores interpret the connection between Siwa and Swing with interesting explanations. After ten days, it was believed that the companion of Siwa, Narai, visits and blesses Thailand for five days.

Triyamphway mantra, actually Tamil Thiruvempavai stanzas of Saint Manikkavasagar, was recited in these days. The first 11 stanzas recited in front of Siwa are known as ""Pothmurai yay", while the other 9 stanzas recited in front of Narai are known as "Pothmurai clang". The two main deities of Shaivism and Vaishnavism are praised by single Thiruvembavai of Manikkavasagar, which is a saivite literature.

== Swing ceremony ==
The swing ceremony (Thai: พิธีโล้ชิงช้า, RTGS: phithi lo chingcha) was grandly celebrated in Thailand until the reign of King Rama VII. After that it was canceled due to reasons such as the wearing of the Swing, injuries at the Swing ceremony, and the unbearable great cost to the Thai government following World War II. Abandoned Great swing still can be seen in front of Wat Suthat of Phra Nakhon, Bangkok. Present day, Triyamphway is celebrated indoors in the Dewasathan temple of Bangkok. The last day of the rite is an offering to Buddha to align with the Buddhist perspectives of Thailand.
