= Swamy (surname) =

Swamy is an Indian surname that is used to refer to many people including the following.

It is used as a part of the name of many Hindu Gods for example, Venkateswara Swamy, Padmanabha Swamy, Chennakesava Swamy etc.

Swamy is also used to address elders and Saints, Sanyasis (monks, ascetics) etc. Swamyji, Swamy ji and Swamiji are also used. ji is a suffix that is used to denote respect. Swamy means Master, owner etc. and the feminine equivalent word is Swamyni or Swamini.

- Arvind Swamy, Tamil actor
- B. G. L. Swamy, Indian botanist
- Narain Swamy, Indian test cricketer
- P. A. V. B. Swamy, statistician
- Puripanda Appala Swamy, Indian writer
- Subramanian Swamy, Indian politician and economist

== See also ==
- Swami, a primarily Hindi honorific
