= Giant Swing =

Historic structure in Bangkok, Thailand

Coordinates: 13°45′7″N 100°30′5″E

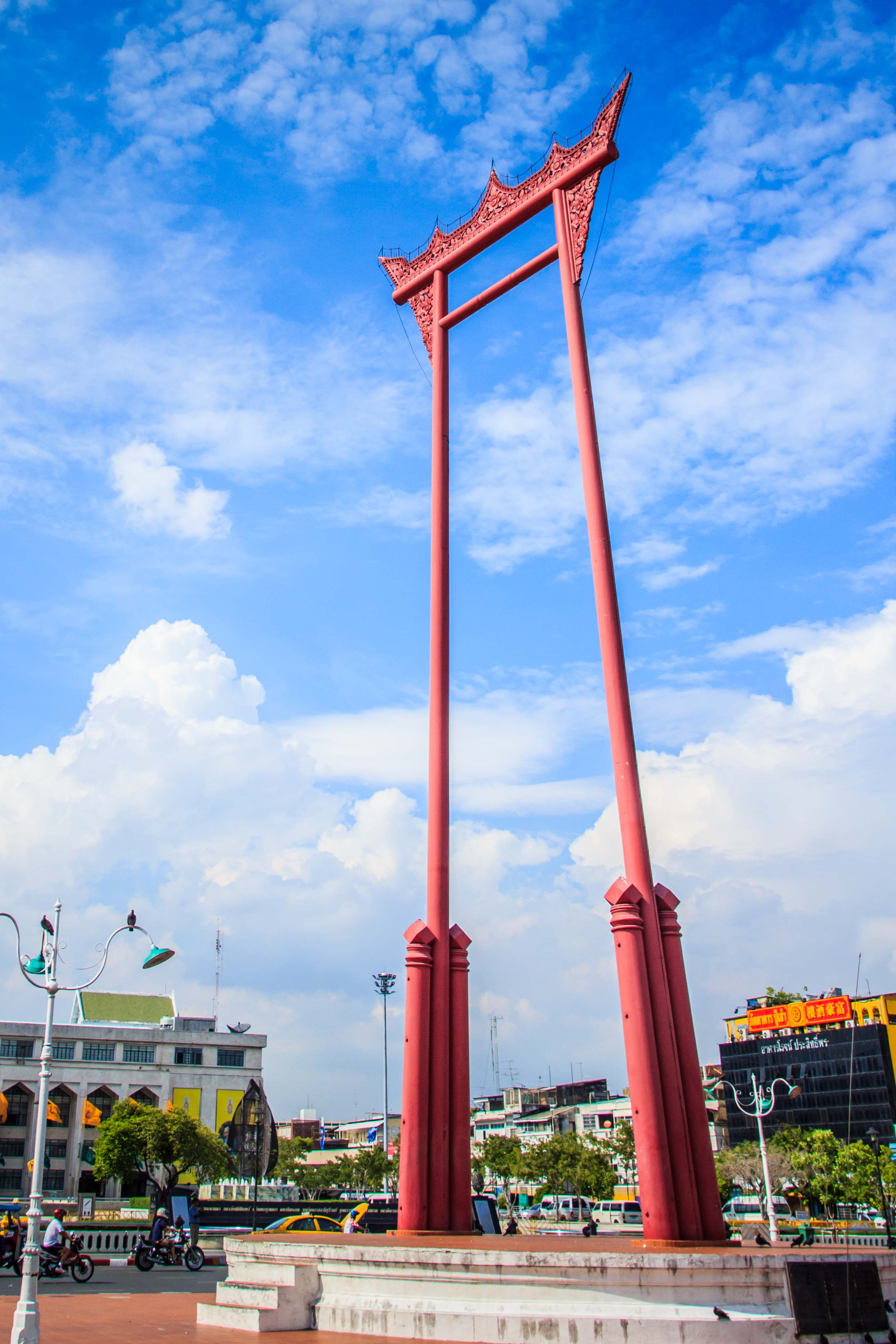
The Giant Swing in Bangkok

The Giant Swing, also known as Sao Chingcha or Sao Ching Cha (Thai: เสาชิงช้า, RTGS: Sao Chingcha, pronounced [sǎw t͡ɕʰīŋ.t͡ɕʰáː]), is a 21.15 m (69.4 ft)-tall, swing-shaped religious structure and a prominent landmark in the Sao Chingcha Subdistrict of Phra Nakhon District, Bangkok, Thailand. Located in front of Wat Suthat, it was formerly used in a traditional Brahmin ceremony and is now one of Bangkok's notable tourist attractions.

It also stands directly before the Devasathan ("Thewasathan Bot Phram," meaning "the abode of the gods"), the Royal Brahmin Office of the Thai royal court. The site is central to the Triyamphawai (Tripavai) ceremony, a sacred Thai Brahman ritual rooted in the recitation of Tamil devotional Tiruppavai hymns.

== History ==
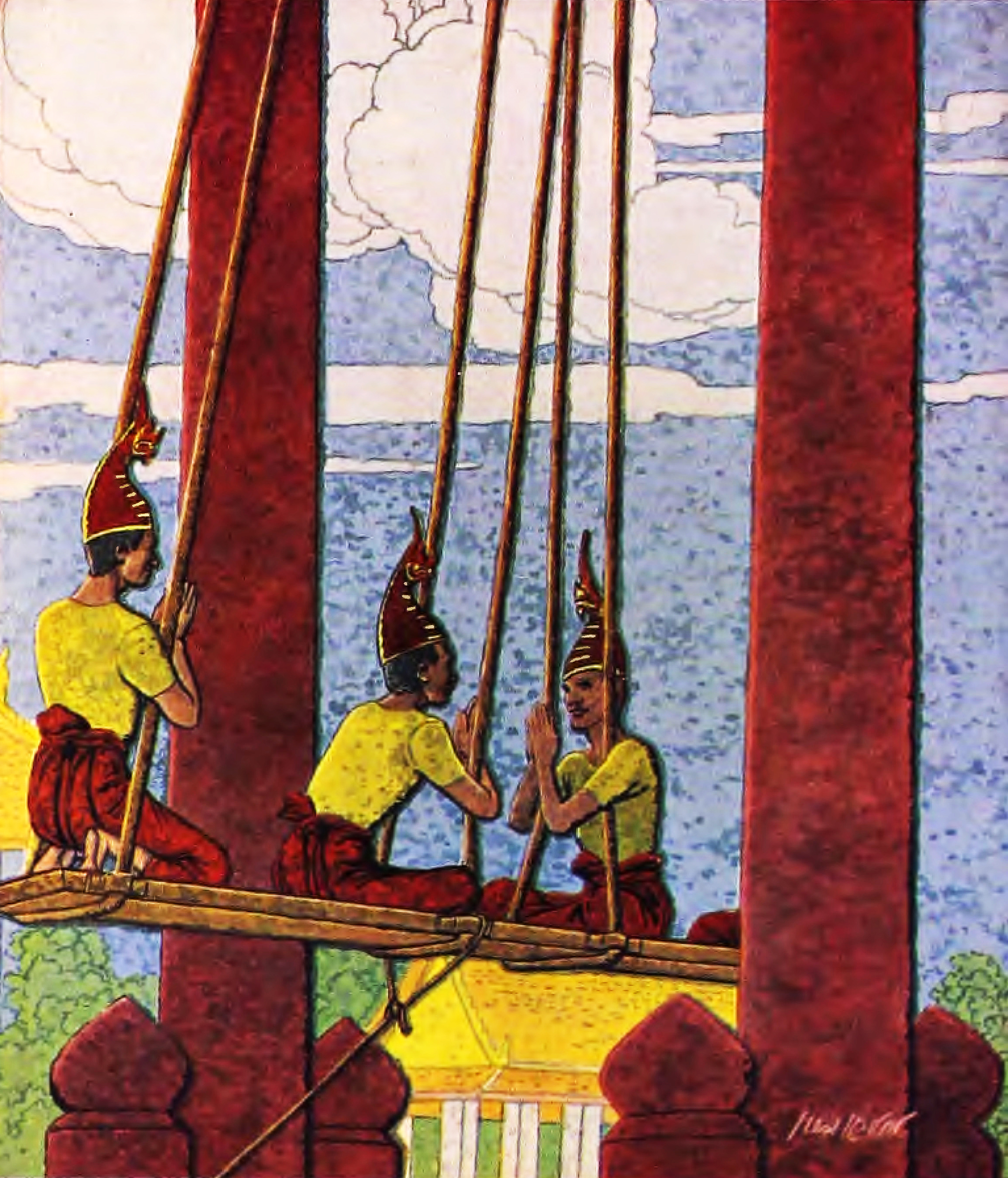
An illustration from the book mentioned below, depicting the Triyampawai ceremony during the reign of King Rama I

The Giant Swing was constructed in 1784 in front of the Devasathan shrine by King Rama I. During the reign of Rama II, the swing ceremony was discontinued as the swing had become structurally damaged by lightning. In 1920, it was renovated and moved to its current location in order to make space for a gas plant. The ceremony was again performed until 1935, when it was discontinued after several fatal accidents.

Further renovations were done in 1959. By 2005, the wooden pillars were showing signs of serious damage from exposure to the elements. A major reconstruction began in April 2005. Six teak tree trunks were used. The two used for the main structure of the swing are over 3.5 m in circumference and over 30m in height. The remaining four are used for support and have a circumference of 2.30 metres and a height of 20 metres. The swing was taken down in late October 2006 and the work finished in December of the same year. The rebuilt swing was dedicated in royal ceremonies presided over by King Bhumibol Adulyadej in September 2007. The timbers of the original swing are preserved in the Bangkok National Museum.

In 2005, the Giant Swing, together with Wat Suthat, was proposed as a future World Heritage site.

== Annual sunset alignment ==
In addition, there is a phenomenon where the setting sun aligns perfectly with the center of the Giant Swing. This occurs once a year, though not on the exact same date each year, usually falling in early March. It creates a beautiful scene, making it popular among photographers. In 2025, this phenomenon took place on 6 March.

== Surroundings ==
=== Wat Suthat Thep Wararam ===
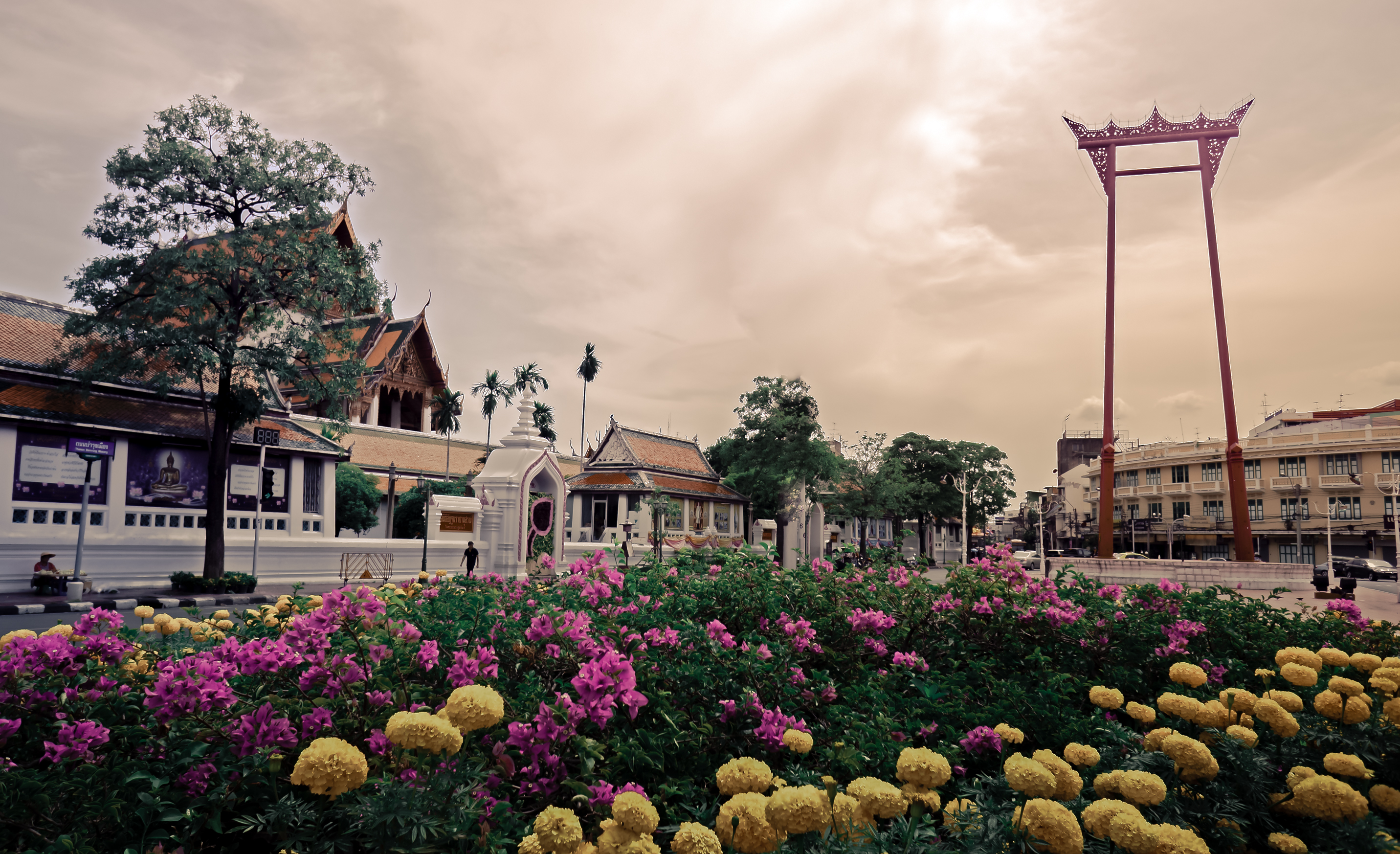
Wat Suthat (left) and the Giant Swing

Wat Suthat Thep Wararam, commonly shortened to "Wat Suthat", is an important temple in Thailand. Inside the grand hall is a Phra Sri Sagaya Munee, its principal Buddha image, which was acquired from Wat Mahathat in Sukhothai. Wat Suthat was built by King Rama I in the center of his capital, but it was completed in the reign of Rama III. Many people often make pilgrimages to worship the Buddha, especially on holy days such as Visakha Bucha Day and Magha Bucha Day.

=== Sarn Choa Po Seu or Tiger God Shrine ===
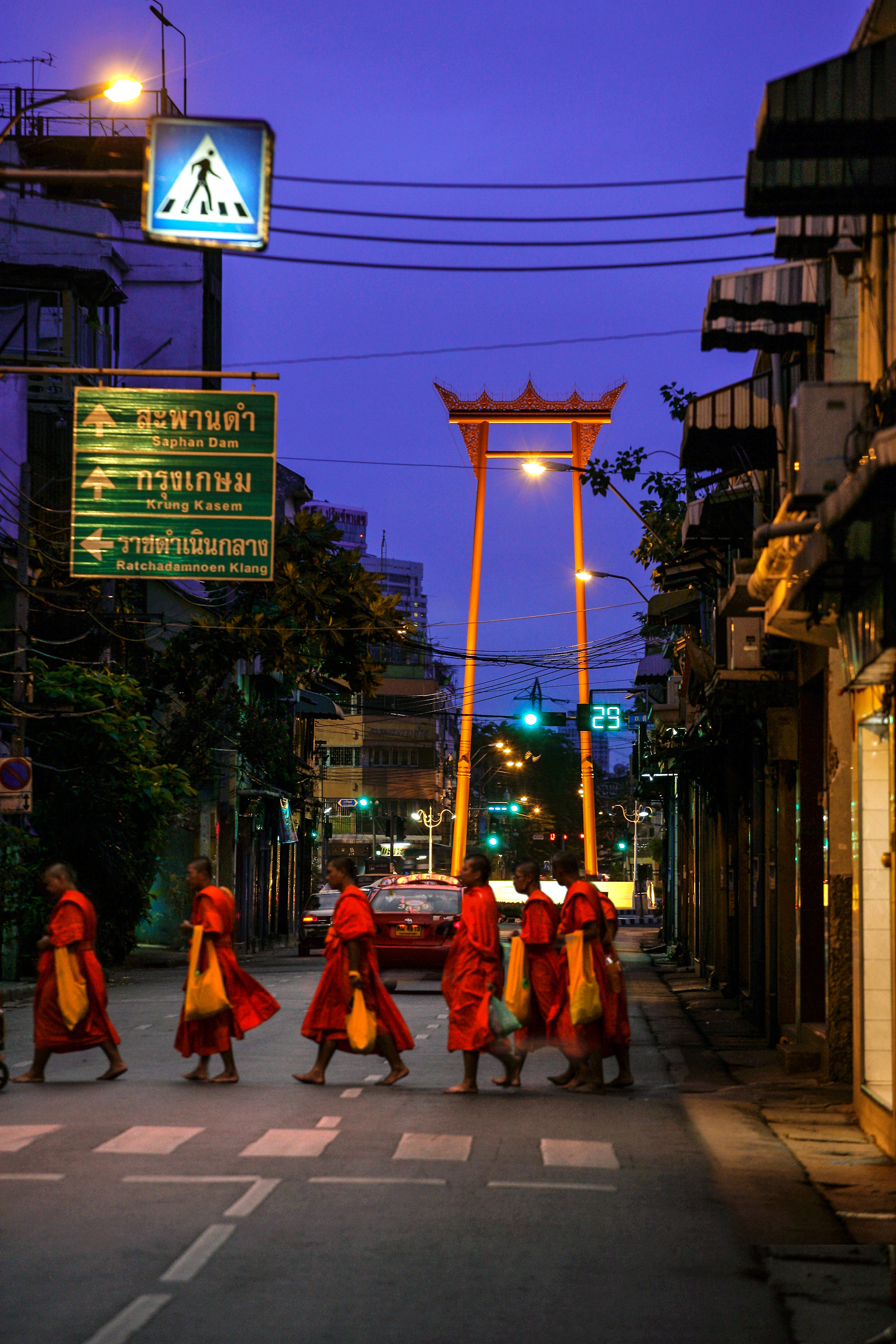
Giant Swing as seen from Bamrung Mueang Road

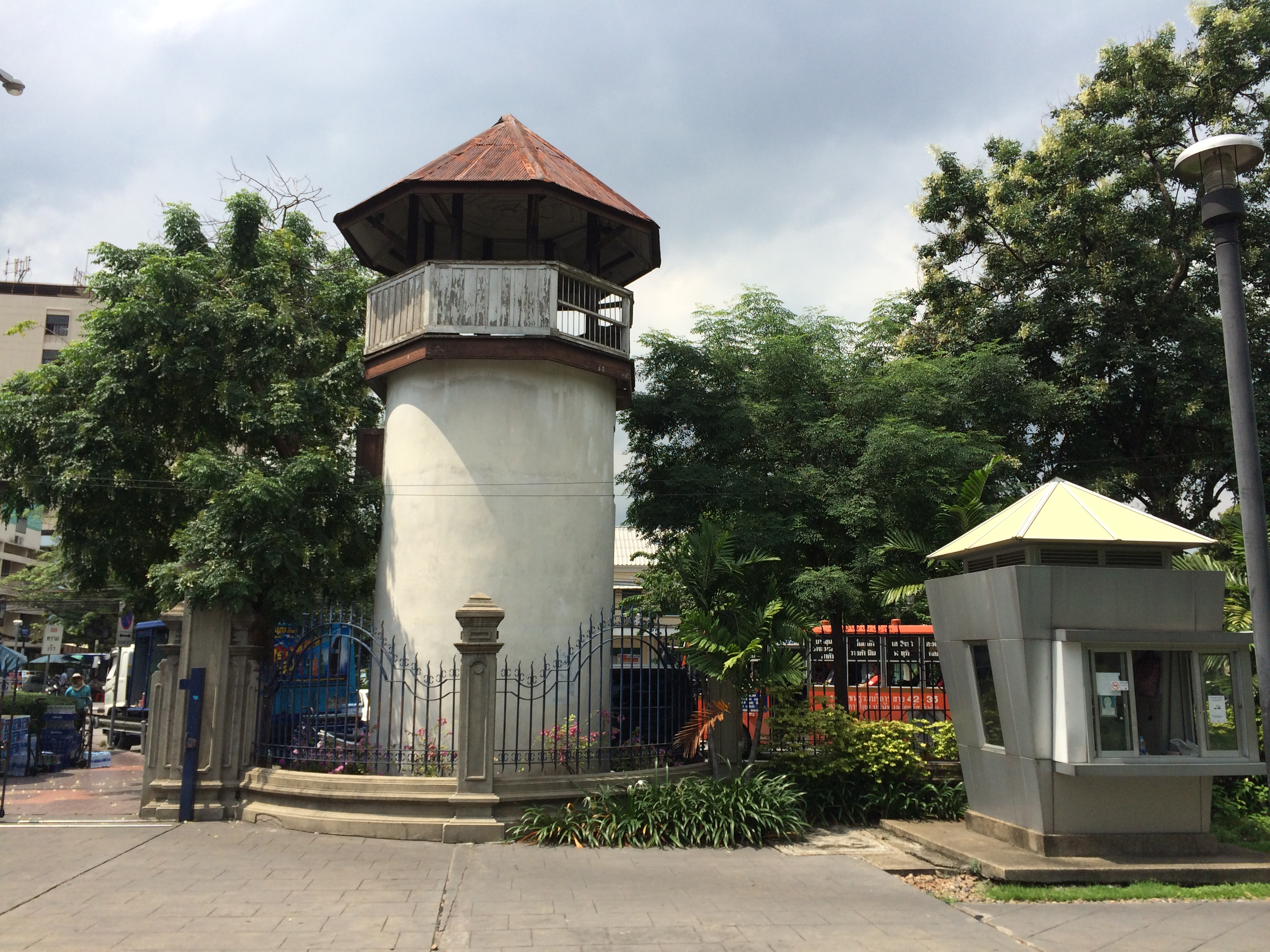
Watchtower of Rommaninat Park

In the quarter there is also a well-known and high regarded Chinese shrine, Sarn Choa Po Seu ('tiger shrine'). Originally it was a building on Bamrung Mueang Road, where the big Chinese communities were. Later, King Rama V expanded the road and had the shrine relocated to the current location on Ta Nao Road, near WatMahanaparam. The site is a place of worship for Thai and Chinese people seeking success in career, money, love, and infant fertility.

Built in 1834 during the reign of King Rama III, the Tiger God Shrine is a Chinese in Thailand. The shrine contains traditional Chinese interior decoration and historical artifacts. It is dedicated to Tua Lao Aie, a Chinese deity associated with good fortune. The shrine is visited by worshippers, particularly durning the Chinese New Year celebrations.

=== Lan Kon Mueng (Townspeople Plaza) ===
At the heart of the quarter is LanKonMueng, in front of city hall. Every morning and evening, this is the recreational area of the locals, where they can exercise such as dance aerobics, jogging, stroll around, gather or just relax, bring children or pets out for a walk, and enjoy the breeze.

=== Devasathan ===
The Devasathan Shrine is the most important religious and ancient place for Hindus in Thailand. It was built in 1784 CE, during the reign of King Rama I. According to ancient tradition, it was built for holding officiating religious ceremonies in the past. Devasathan Shrine has many important sanctuaries: the Shiva and Parvati Shrine, the Brahma and Sarasvati Shrine, the Ganesha and Siddhi Shrine, and the Vishnu and Lakshmi Shrine.

=== Trok Mo Market ===
In a small alley off Bamrung Mueang Road on the western side of the Sao Chingcha lies a long-established historic market and community. It was originally located at the present site of the City Hall under the name "Sao Chingcha Market," until 1973, when the Bangkok Metropolitan Administration building was constructed. The market was then relocated to its current site, a narrow and elongated lane. Despite its modest size, it remains a vibrant and lively morning market, operating from early morning until around 11 a.m.

=== Vishnu Temple ===
The small temple of Lord Vishnu on Unakan Road, beside of Wat Suthat, was built in 1982, on the occasion of the 200th anniversary of Rattanakosin, by the Indian–Thai Chamber of Commerce Association as a sign of the good relations between Thailand and India. The idol of Vishnu was brought from India.

=== Benjamarachalai School ===
A girls' secondary school on Siriphong Road, just behind and diagonally opposite the Vishnu Temple, was established in 1913. It stands on the former site of the residence of Prince Marubongsa Siribadhana, a half-brother of King Rama V.

=== Hindu Samaj Bangkok ===
Adjacent to Benjamarachalai School is the Hindu Samaj Bangkok, an association of the Hindu community in Thailand. Within its grounds is the Dev Mandir Temple, another important Hindu place of worship in Bangkok, established in 1925 under the Vaishnavite tradition. The temple houses several Hindu deities, with the principal deities being Vishnu and Lakshmi. It is a popular site for prayers related to love and relationships. Nearby is also Bharat Vidyalaya School, an educational institution offering classes from kindergarten to Grade 6, located in an adjacent alley.

=== Rommaninat Park ===
A small public park covering approximately 11 acres was created in 1992 to commemorate the 60th birthday anniversary of Queen Sirikit. It was built on the former site of Klong Prem Central Prison, and thus still retains some of the old structures that indicate its previous use as a correctional facility, such as watchtowers.

== Swing ceremony ==
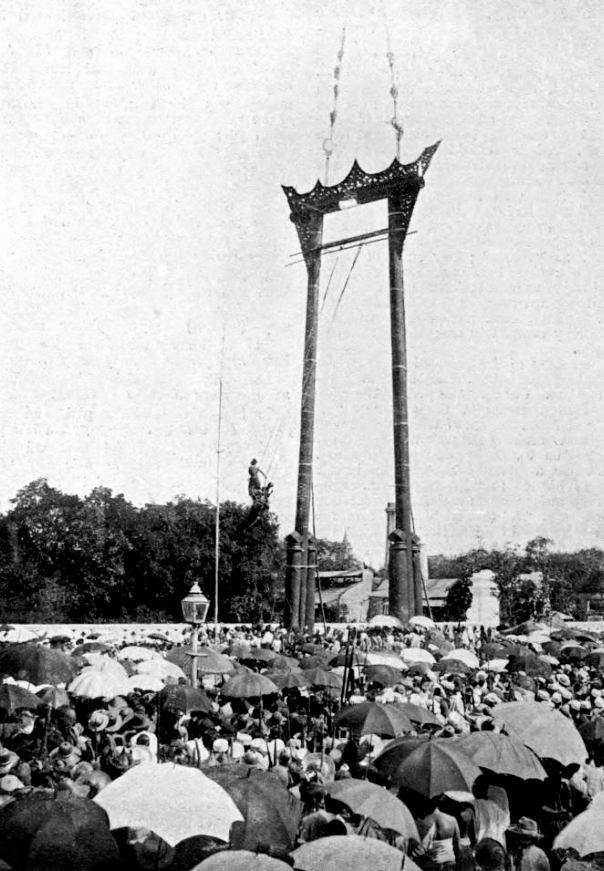
The Swinging Festival c. 1900

An annual swinging ceremony known as Triyampavai-Tripavai was held at Giant Swings of major cities until 1935, when it was abolished for safety reasons. The name of the ceremony was derived from the names of two Tamil language Hindu chants: Thiruvempavai (a Shaivite hymn by Manikkavacakar) and Thiruppavai (a Vaishnavite hymn by Andal). Among Thai people, the ceremony was popularly known as Lo Jin Ja ("pulling the swing"). It is known that Tamil verses from Thiruvempavai — Sivalaya Vasal Thirappu ("opening the portals of Shiva's home") — were recited at this ceremony and verses from Tirupavai, as well as the coronation ceremony of the Thai king and queen. As said by T.P. Meenakshisundaram, the name of the festival shows that Thiruppavai has been recited as well.

According to ancient Hindu mythology, after Brahma created the world he sent Shiva to look after it. When Shiva descended to the earth, Naga serpents wrapped around the mountains in order to keep the earth in place. After Shiva found the earth solid, the Nagas moved to the seas in celebration and made the earth stable completely. The Swing Ceremony was a re-enactment of this. The pillars of the Giant Swing represented the mountains, while the circular base of the swing represented the earth and the seas. In the ceremony Brahamanas would swing, trying to grab a bag of coins placed on one of the pillars.

== In popular culture ==
The Giant Swing is featured in the video games Mario Kart Tour and Mario Kart 8 Deluxe as part of the Bangkok Rush racecourse.

== See also ==
- The appearance of the Giant Swing is sometimes confused with unrelated gate structures in other Asian cultures:
  - Hongsalmun, gate in Korean architecture
  - Iljumun, first gate of Korean Buddhist temple
  - Paifang, Chinese architectural arch or gateway structure
  - Shanmen, gate of Chinese Buddhist temple
  - Tam quan, gate of Vietnamese temple
  - Torii, Japanese gate found at the entrance of or within a Shinto shrine
