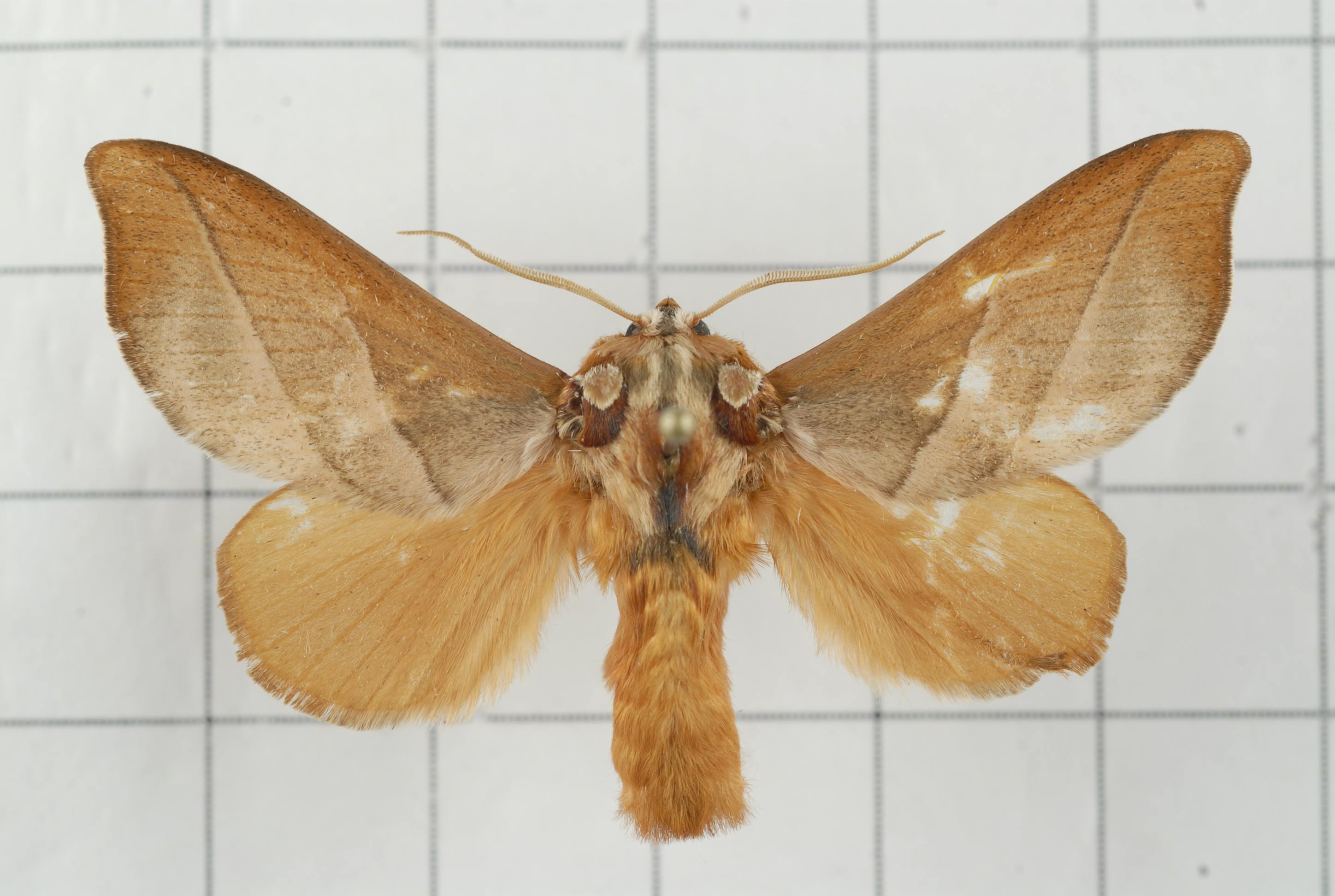

Scientific classification
- Domain: Eukaryota
- Kingdom: Animalia
- Phylum: Arthropoda
- Class: Insecta
- Order: Lepidoptera
- Family: Limacodidae
- Genus: Mahanta
- Species: M. kawadai

Binomial name
- Mahanta kawadai Yoshimoto, 1995

= Mahanta kawadai =

Species of moth

Mahanta kawadai is a moth in the genus Mahanta. It's in the family Limacodidae. It is found in Taiwan.
