= Swami =

Honorific title for Hindu monks; Indian surname

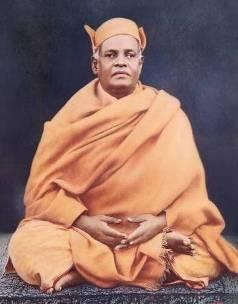
Swami Saradananda

Swami ([sʋaːmiː]; Sanskrit: स्वामी, romanized: svāmī; sometimes abbreviated sw.) in Hinduism is an honorific title given to an ascetic who has chosen the path of renunciation (sanyāsa). It is used either before or after the subject's name (usually an adopted religious name). An alternative form, swamini (svāmini), is sometimes used by female renunciates.

== Etymology ==
The meaning of the Sanskrit root of the word swami is "[he who is] one with his self" (swa stands for "self"), and can roughly be translated as "he/she who knows and is master of himself/herself". The term is often attributed to someone who has achieved mastery of a particular yogic system or demonstrated profound devotion (bhakti) to one or more Hindu gods. The Oxford English Dictionary gives the etymology as:

svāmī 'master, lord, prince', used by Hindus as a term of respectful address, < Sanskrit svāmin in some senses, also the idol or temple of a god.

As a direct form of address, or as a stand-in for a swami's name, it is often rendered Swamiji (also Swami-ji or Swami Ji).

== Current usage ==
In modern Gaudiya Vaishnavism, Swami is also one of the 108 names for a sannyasi given in Bhaktisiddhanta Sarasvati's Gaudiya Kanthahara, along with Goswami, also traditionally used as an honorific title.

Swami is also the surname of the Bairagi caste in Haryana, Uttar Pradesh, and Rajasthan. In Bengali, the word (pronounced [ˈʃami]), while carrying its original meaning, also has the meaning of "husband" in another context. The word also means "husband" in Malay, in which it is spelled suami, and in Khmer, Assamese and Odia. The Thai word for "husband", sami (สามี) or swami (สวามี) is a cognate word.

== See also ==
- Dashanami Sampradaya
