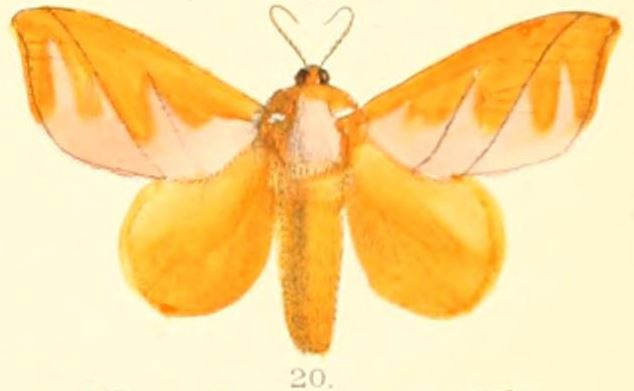
- Mahanta quadrilinea

Scientific classification
- Kingdom: Animalia
- Phylum: Arthropoda
- Clade: Pancrustacea
- Class: Insecta
- Order: Lepidoptera
- Family: Limacodidae
- Genus: Mahanta; Moore, 1879

Type species
- Mahanta quadrilinea Moore, 1879

= Mahanta (moth) =

Genus of moths

Mahanta is a genus of moths in the family Limacodidae.

== Species ==
- Mahanta fraterna Solovyev, 2005
- Mahanta kawadai Yoshimoto, 1995 (Taiwan)
- Mahanta leworthyi Holloway, 1986 (Brunei)
- Mahanta quadrilinea Moore, 1879 (India)
- Mahanta svetlanae Solovyev, 2005 (Thailand)
- Mahanta tanyae Solovyev, 2005 (China)
- Mahanta yoshimotoi Wang & Huang, 2003 (China)
- Mahanta zolotuhini Solovyev, 2005
