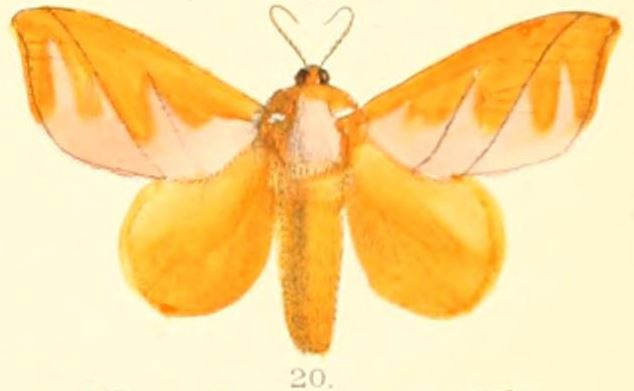

Scientific classification
- Domain: Eukaryota
- Kingdom: Animalia
- Phylum: Arthropoda
- Class: Insecta
- Order: Lepidoptera
- Family: Limacodidae
- Genus: Mahanta
- Species: M. quadrilinea

Binomial name
- Mahanta quadrilinea Moore, 1879

= Mahanta quadrilinea =

Species of moth

Mahanta quadrilinea is a moth of the family Limacodidae. It is found in India and Bhutan.
