= Devasathan =

Hindu temple in Bangkok

Coordinates: 13°45′9.1368″N 100°30′2.1924″E

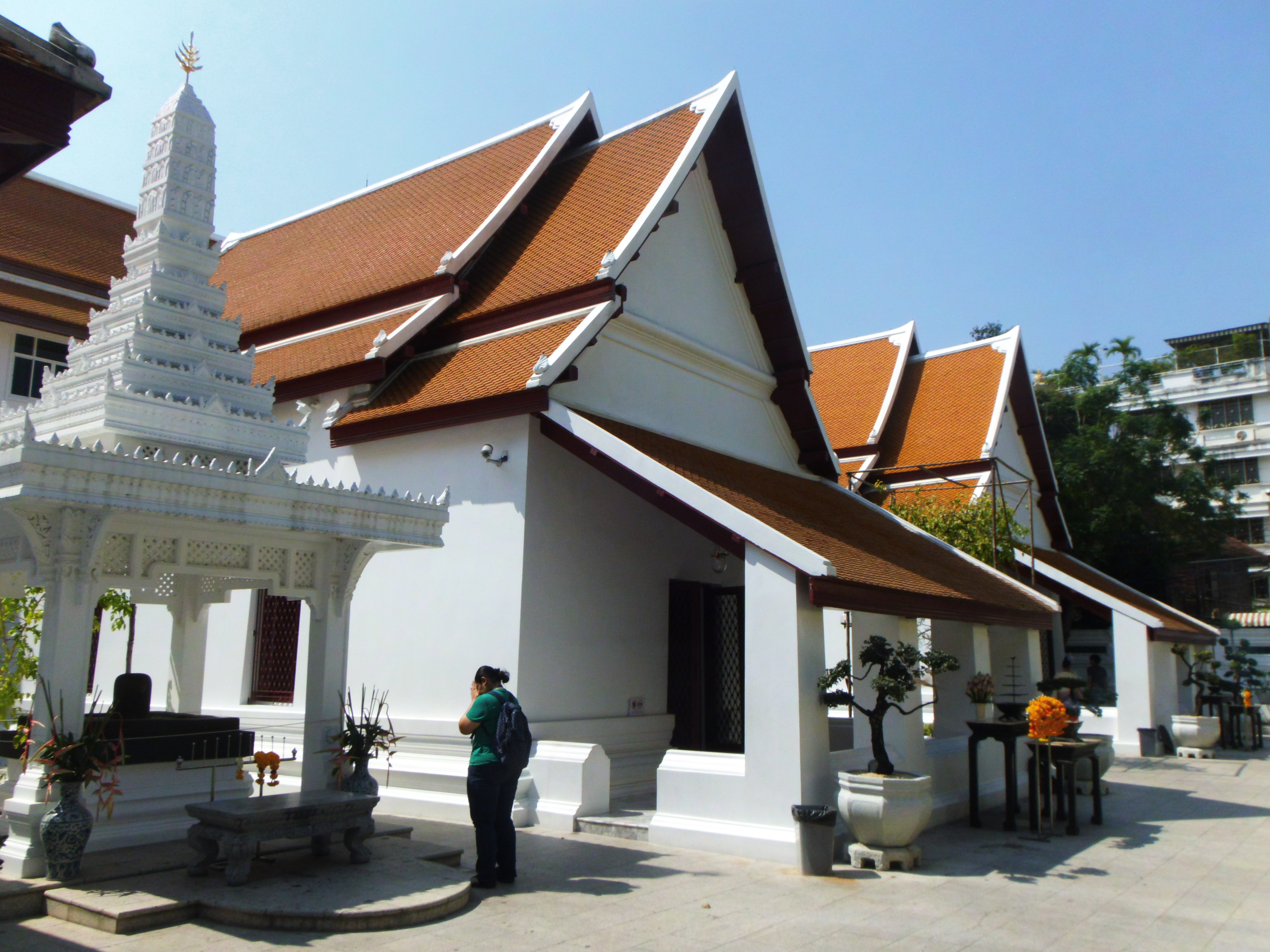
- The Divine Halls inside the Devasathan in Bangkok

- Location within Bangkok

Religion
- Affiliation: Hinduism
- District: Phra Nakhon
- Province: Bangkok
- Deity: Shiva and Vishnu
- Festival: Triyampawai ceremony

Location
- Location: 268, Ban Dinso Road, Sao Chingcha Subdistrict, Phra Nakhon District, Bangkok, Thailand
- Country: Thailand
- Interactive map of Devasathan

Architecture
- Type: Thai Architecture
- Creator: Rama I
- Completed: 1784

Website
- Devasthan

Devasathan (Thai: เทวสถานโบสถ์พราหมณ์; RTGS: Thewasathan Bot Phram; meaning 'the abode of the gods') or Royal Brahmin Office of Thai Royal Court (Thai: สำนักพราหมณ์พระราชครูในสำนักพระราชวัง) is a Hindu temple near Wat Suthat in the Phra Nakhon District, Bangkok, Thailand. The temple is the official centre of Hinduism in Thailand. The temple is the home of the Court Brahmins, who are descended from an ancient lineage of priests from Rameswaram, Tamil Nadu. The Brahmins perform many important royal and religious ceremonies for the Monarchy of Thailand every year. The temple was founded in 1784 by King Rama I, the founder of the Chakri dynasty.

== Structures ==
The temple is enclosed by a white wall. The temple is dominated by three large rectangular buildings, on an East to West axis. Each of the three white structures is a shrine dedicated to a particular Hindu deity.

- Phra Isuan Shrine (สถานพระอิศวร) – Shiva. The largest shrine is located to the south and is the centre of Shaivist worship. In the western end is an altar. Under a white canopy stands a large bronze statue of a blessing Shiva, on either side are statues of dancing Shivas. Other figures include those of Uma (Shiva's wife) and Nandi (Shiva's vehicle). In the middle stands two upright posts to which a small swing-seat is suspended on certain ceremonial occasions.
- Phra Phikkhanesuan Shrine (สถานพระพิฆเนศวร) – Ganesha. The shrine is the one in the middle. The shrine contains five statues of sitting Ganesha, made of granite, sandstone, bronze and two of green stone.
- Phra Narai Shrine (สถานพระนารายณ์) – Narayana or Vishnu. The shrine is located in the north and is the centre of Vaishnavist worship. The shrine contains a large statue of Vishnu and a smaller statue of Lakshmi and Bhūmi (Vishnu's wife). In the middle stands two upright posts to which a small swing-seat is suspended on certain ceremonial occasions.
- A small outdoor shrine to Phra Phrom Shrine (ศาลท้าวมหาพรหม) – Brahma. Similar in appearance to the Erawan Shrine.
- The Giant Swing, is located outside in front of the temple, it was once used for a ceremony called the Triyamphway Ceremony (Triyampavai-Tripavai). The ceremony was discontinued in 1935.

== See also ==
- Hinduism in Thailand
- Coronation of the Thai monarch
