= Wat Suthat =

Buddhist temple in Bangkok, Thailand

Wat Suthat Thepphawararam Ratchaworamahawihan
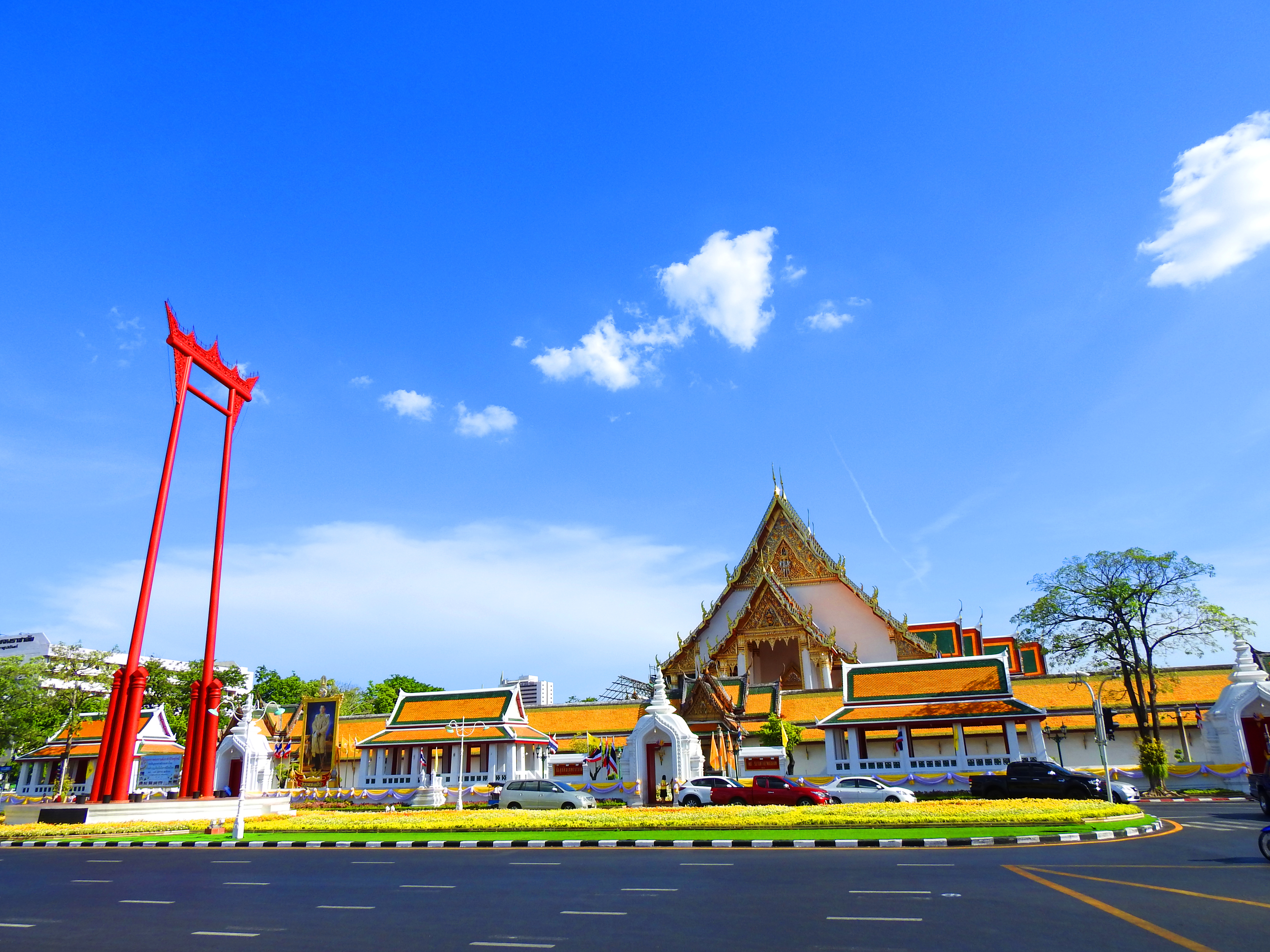

- Location within Bangkok

Religion
- Affiliation: Buddhism

Location
- Location: 146 Bamrung Mueang Rd, Wat Ratchabophit, Phra Nakhon, Bangkok
- Country: Thailand
- Coordinates: 13.751028°N 100.501004°E

Architecture
- Founder: King Rama I
- Completed: 1847/1848; 178 years ago

Wat Suthat Thepphawararam (Thai: วัดสุทัศนเทพวราราม; Thai pronunciation: [wát sù.tʰât tʰêːp.pʰá.wá.rāː.rāːm]) is a Buddhist temple in Bangkok, Thailand. It is classified as a first-class royal temple, one of ten such temples in Bangkok (and twenty-three in Thailand). It is a temple located within the Inner Rattanakosin area, distinguished by the Giant Swing that stands directly in front of it.

Construction was begun by King Rama I in 1807. The temple was originally called "Wat Maha Sutthawat" (วัดมหาสุทธาวาส) and was built in a grove of Combretum trees. Further construction and decoration were carried out under King Rama II, who personally helped carve the wooden doors, but the complex was not completed until the reign of King Rama III in 1847 or 1848.

The temple enshrines the Buddha image Phra Si Sakyamuni (พระศรีศากยมุนี; RTGS: Phra Si Sakkayamuni), which was transferred from Sukhothai Province. Around the lower terrace of the main base are twenty-eight Chinese pagodas symbolizing the twenty-eight Buddhas of Theravada tradition. Wat Suthat also houses Phra Buddha Trilokachet (พระพุทธไตรโลกเชษฐ์; RTGS: Phra Phuttha Trai Lokkachet) in the ubosot (ordination hall), and Phra Buddha Setthamuni (พระพุทธเศรษฐมุนี; RTGS: Phra Phuttha Setthamuni) in the sala kan parian, the preaching and assembly hall.

In 2005, the temple was submitted to UNESCO for consideration as a future World Heritage Site.

== History ==
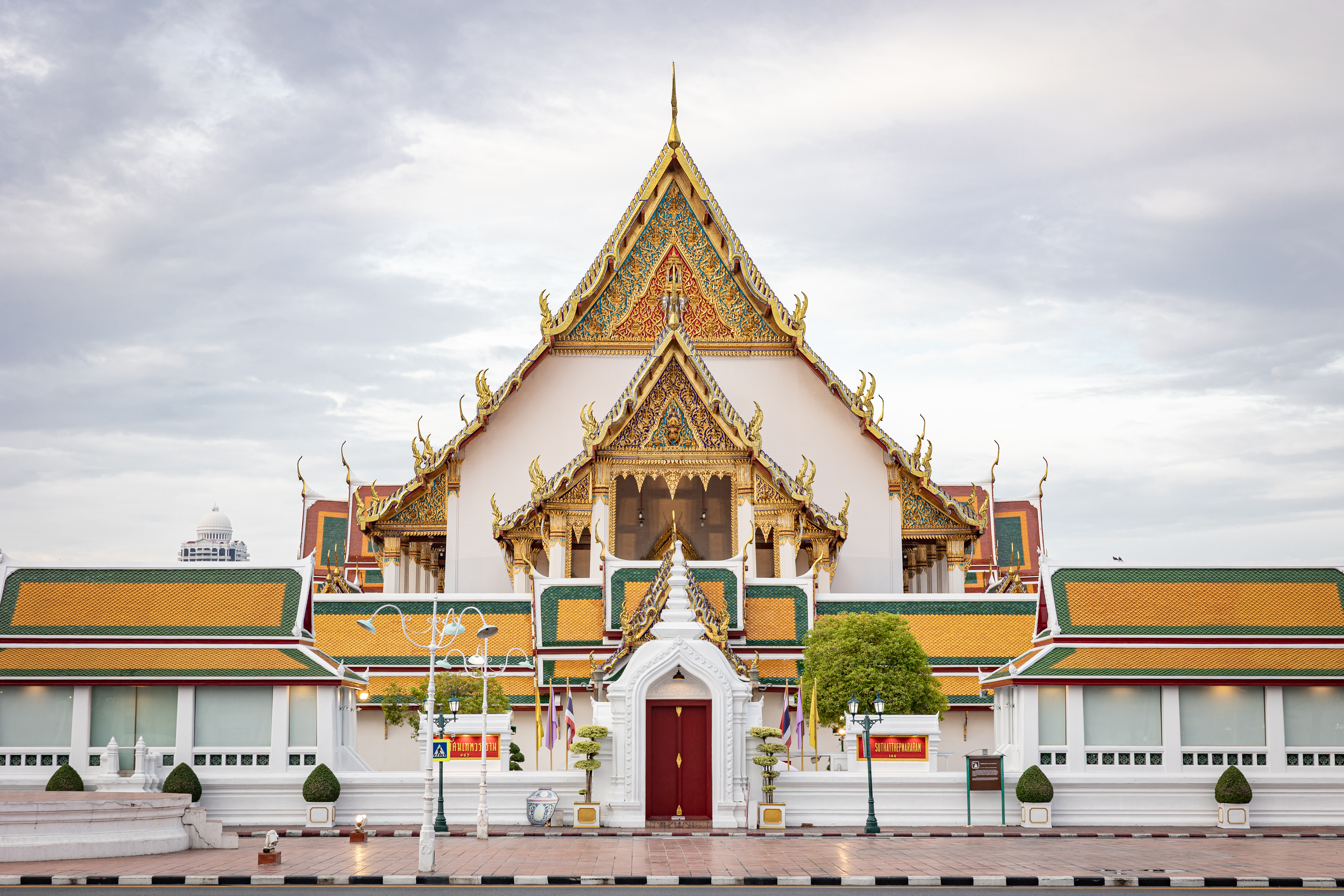
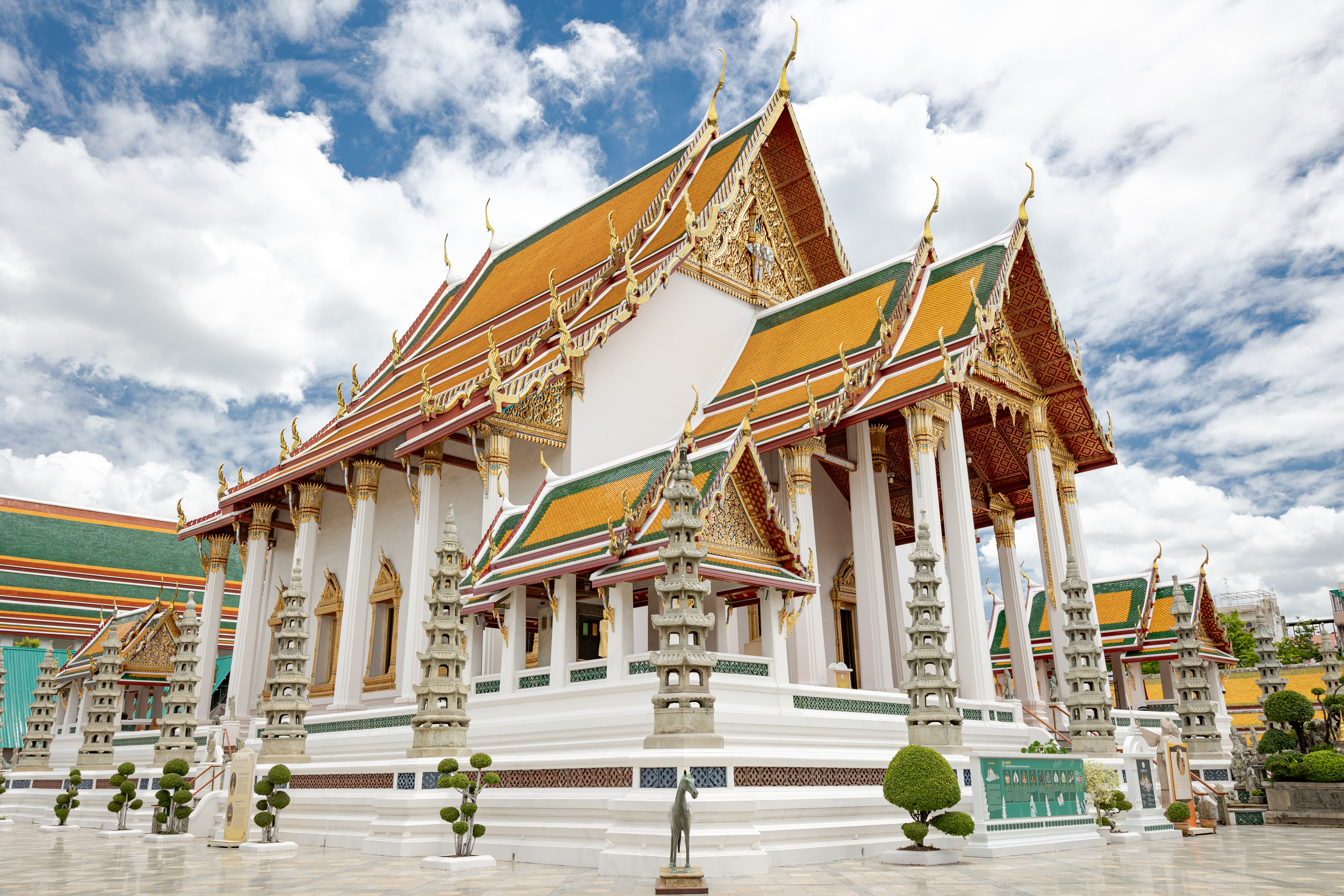
The main vihāra

In the early Rattanakosin period, King Phutthayotfa Chulalok (Rama I) ordered the construction of a new temple within the inner city of Bangkok. In 1807 it was given the initial name "Wat Mahasuthawas". The site lay in low-lying land known as Dong Sakae, so the ground was first filled in and then the temple was built. Construction began with the main vihāra, which was intended to enshrine the large Buddha image Phra Si Sakyamuni (commonly called Phra To), transferred from the great vihāra of Wat Mahathat in Sukhothai. Nicolas Revire gives the image as a bronze eight metres high and of the 14th or 15th century. However, King Rama I died before the temple had been formally established as a monastery, and it therefore became popularly known as Wat Phra To, Wat Phra Yai, or Wat Sao Ching Cha.

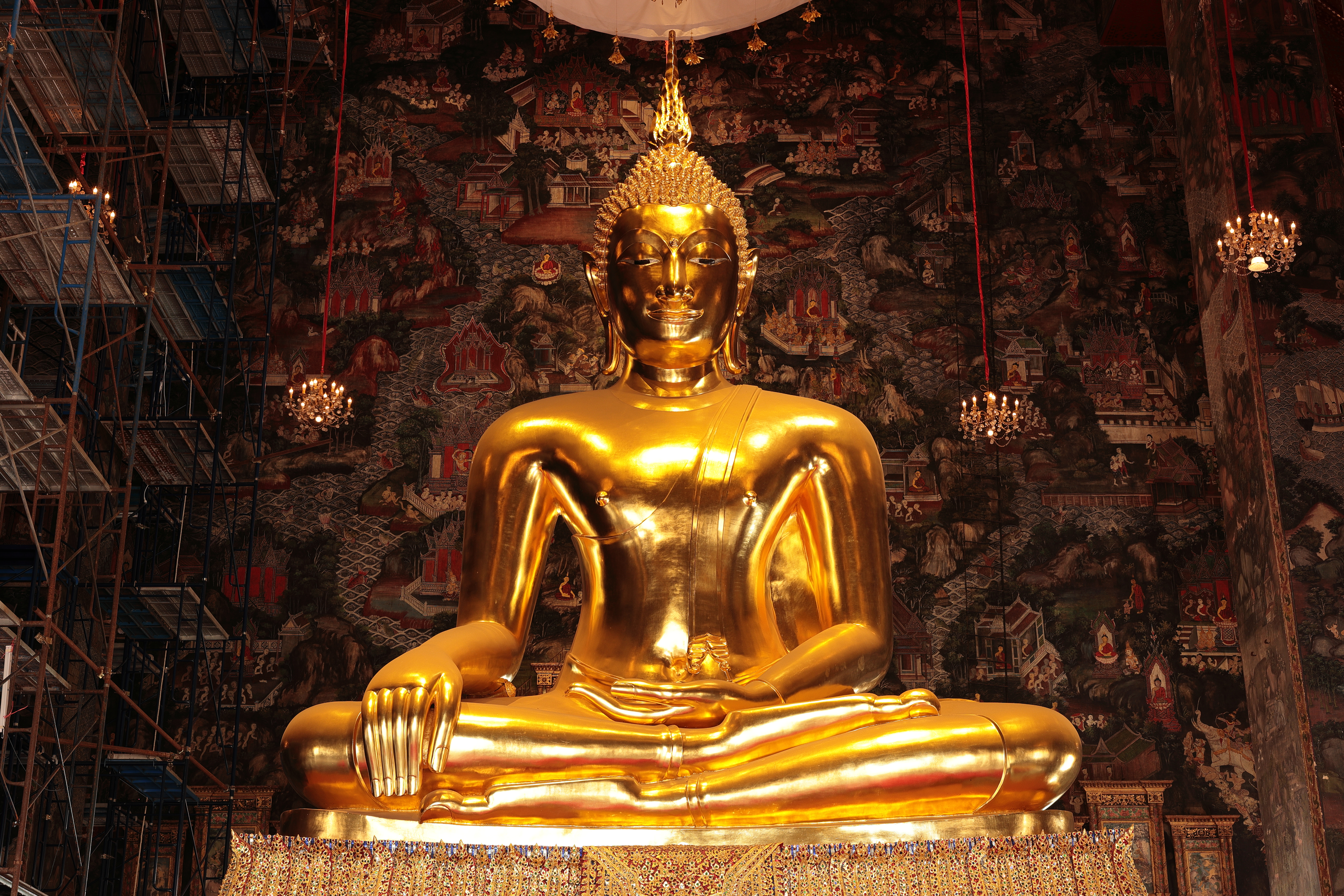
Phra Si Sakyamuni is enshrined in the vihāra, also known for its exquisite murals.

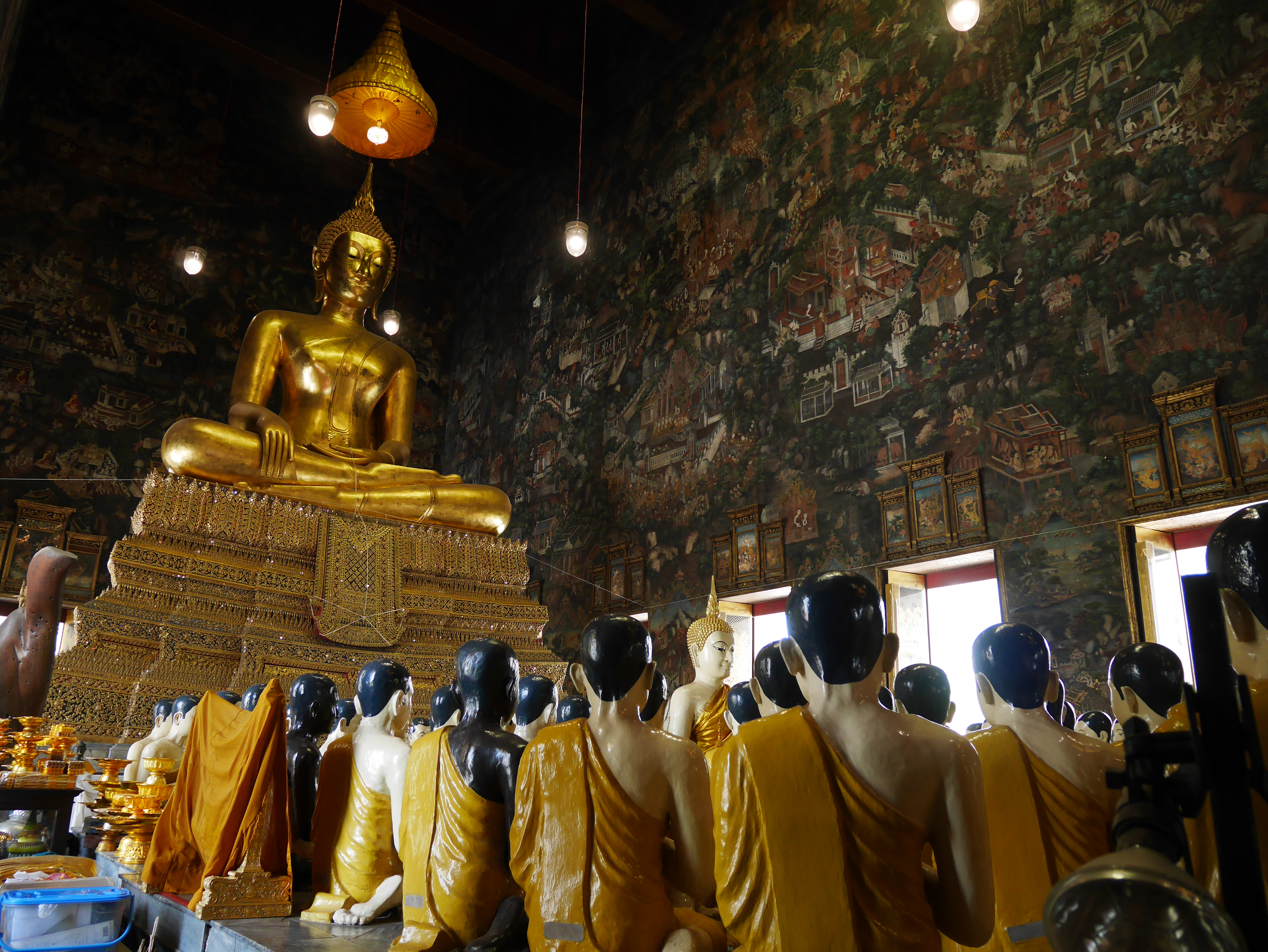
Phra Buddha Trilokachet and Phra Asiti, the Eighty Great Disciples of Buddha

During the reign of King Phutthaloetla Naphalai (Rama II), work on the temple was resumed, and the king himself carved the wooden doors of the vihāra. He too passed away before the project was completed. The construction of the temple was finally brought to completion in 1847, in the reign of King Nangklao (Rama III), who conferred on it the official name "Wat Suthat Thepphawararam", although contemporary chronicles record the form "Wat Suthat Theptharam". Under King Mongkut (Rama IV), the principal Buddha images in the vihāra, ubosot (ordination hall), and preaching hall were given harmonized names: Phra Si Sakyamuni, Phra Buddha Trilokachet, and Phra Phuttha Sretthamuni respectively.

Within Wat Suthat Thepphawararam stands the royal memorial to King Ananda Mahidol (Rama VIII). His royal ashes were enshrined in 1950 in the decorative cloth panel (pha thip) at the front of the throne base of Phra Si Sakyamuni, and an annual royal merit-making ceremony commemorating the anniversary of his death is held there on 9 June.

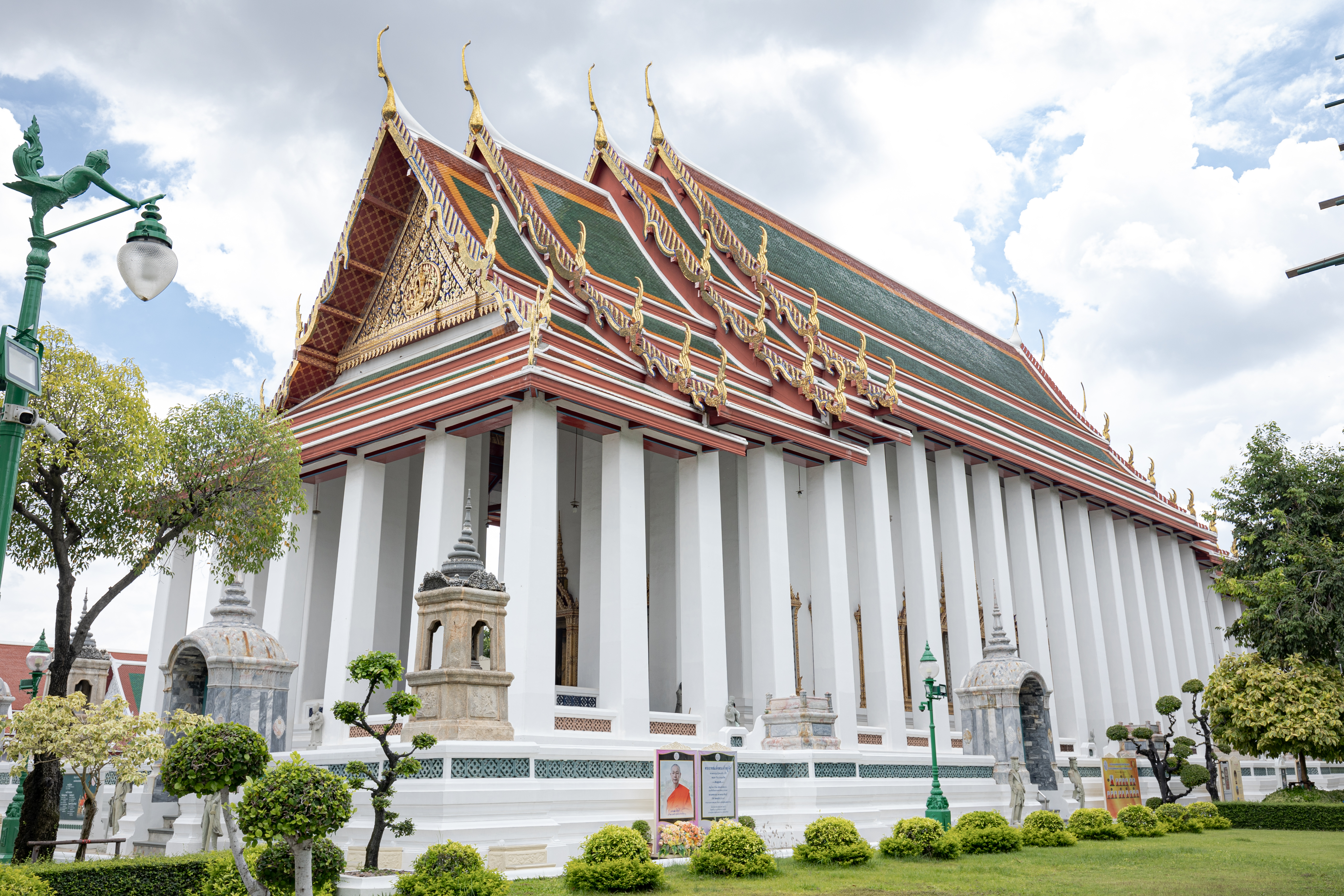
The ubosot is the longest in Thailand

The ubosot of Wat Suthat is regarded as the longest ordination hall in Thailand. Its principal image, Phra Buddha Trilokachet, is a Buddha in the Maravijaya (subduing Mara) posture. Both the ubosot and this image date to the reign of King Rama III. The inner walls are covered with mural paintings executed by court artists of that period. The door and window frames are topped with spired pediments in the form of miniature chedis, giving them a distinctive and highly refined appearance.

Around the ubosot stand eight boundary-stone shrines (sema), set upon the surrounding cloister wall. Each contains a pair of grey marble boundary stones carved with a three-headed elephant, each trunk holding a closed lotus bud, with three open lotus blossoms above. On the north and south sides of the cloister wall there are four raised pavilions on each side, used as royal platforms for scattering alms to the people during state ceremonies; these are known as "koi proi than", or alms-scattering pavilions.

=== The Dvaravati relief ===
Mounted on the rear of the base of Phra Si Sakyamuni is a gilded Dvaravati limestone low relief, 2.4 metres high and of the 7th or 8th century. It is reported to have been brought from Nakhon Pathom during the reign of Rama I. The relief is carved in two ascending registers. The lower shows the Great Miracle at Śrāvastī. The Buddha is seated in majesty in bhadrāsana and honoured by King Prasenajit and his court, with heretics in disarray at the lower right, their leader Pūrana Kāśyapa in the foreground, and multiplied buddhas above. The upper register repeats the posture, with the Buddha seated on Indra's throne on Mount Meru.

Nicolas Revire holds that the iconography follows no single text. The mango tree belongs to the Pali account of the Twin Miracle. The multiplication, the appearance of Brahmā and Indra, the defeated Pūrana Kāśyapa and the lotus supported by nāga kings occur in the Sanskrit Divyāvadāna and not in the Pali. A fifteenth-century Pali text, the Buddhapādamaṅgala, has also been used to explain the throne, seven centuries after the relief was carved. Revire declines to attach the mixed iconography to any particular Buddhist tradition or nikāya. He reads the enthroned Buddha with pendant legs as deriving from a theme current in the western Indian caves from the late fifth century. In his account it was used less to illustrate a particular episode than to present the Buddha as lord of the universe. For the conflation with Indra he cites the dedicatory inscription of the Vākāṭaka minister Varāhadeva at Ajaṇṭā Cave 16, which calls the sanctuary the dwelling of Indra and names it Vaijayanta after Indra's palace.

A second Dvaravati relief of the same subject, limestone with traces of lacquer and painting and 127 cm high, is in the Bangkok National Museum (inv. D.V. 3). It is said to have been found at Wat Chin in Ayutthaya but most probably also came from Nakhon Pathom, and Revire compares its form to the sema boundary stones of Isan. Of the two nāga kings named in the Divyāvadāna, the Wat Suthat relief shows one and the museum stele none. Revire notes that H. G. Quaritch Wales identified the upper register as the First Sermon, which he regards as an error.

== Preta of Wat Suthat ==
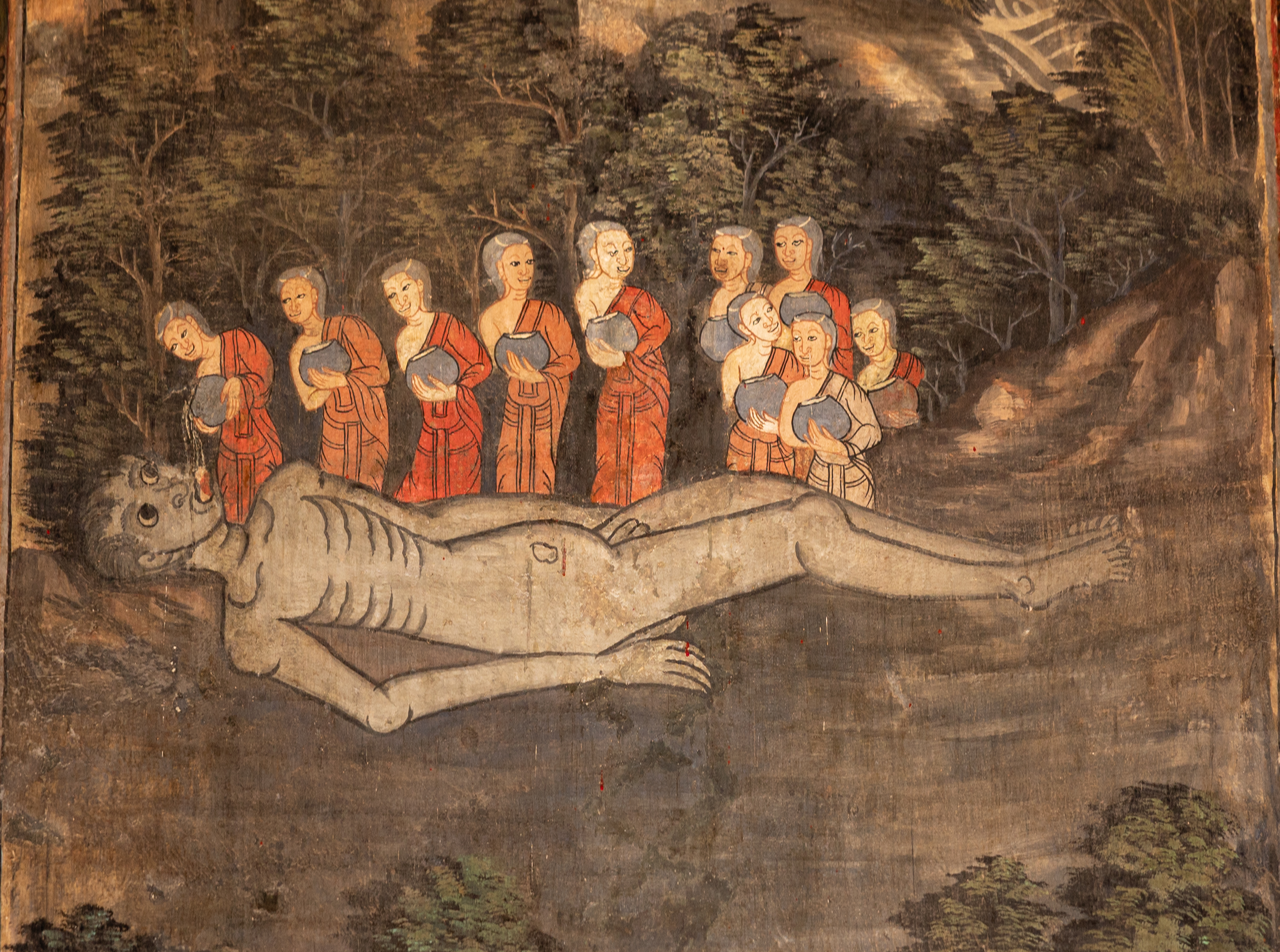
A mural depicting a preta and procession of monks in the ordination hall

The temple dates back to the beginning of the Rattanakosin Kingdom. At that time, it was said that a preta (Thai: เปรต, pret), a kind of undead being in Buddhist and Siamese belief, often depicted as a tall, thin, hungry ghost with a terrifying howling cry, would appear in front of the temple at night. One mural inside the ordination hall also depicts a preta lying down to receive water from monks. This gave rise to the saying "Pret Wat Suthat" (เปรตวัดสุทัศน์), often paired with "Raeng Wat Saket" (แร้งวัดสระเกศ lit. 'vultures of Wat Saket'). In front of the temple stands the Sao Chingcha, or Giant Swing, a towering Hindu-style structure.

== Gallery ==
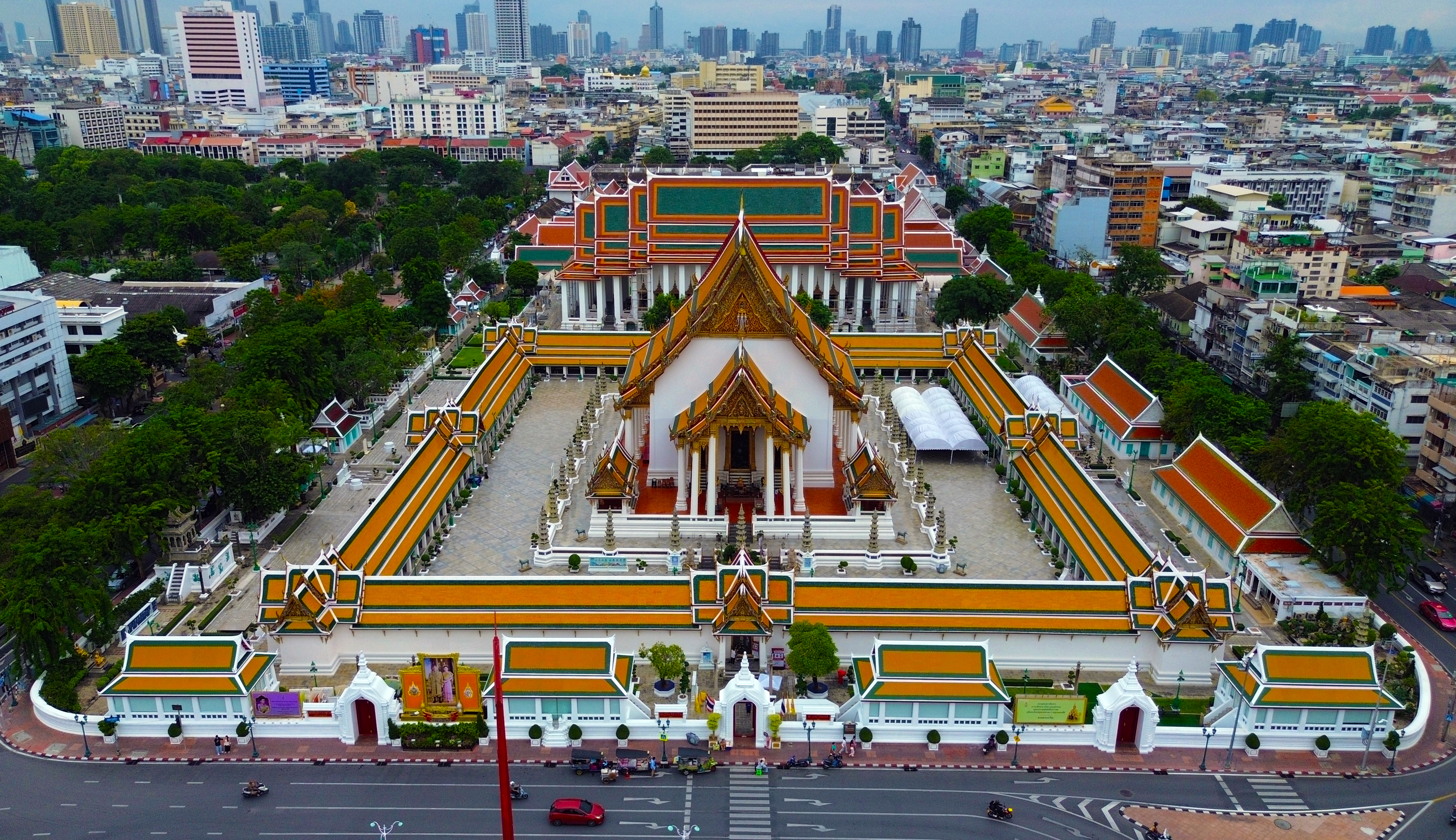
Wat Suthat Thep Wararam Ratchaworamahawihan in 2025

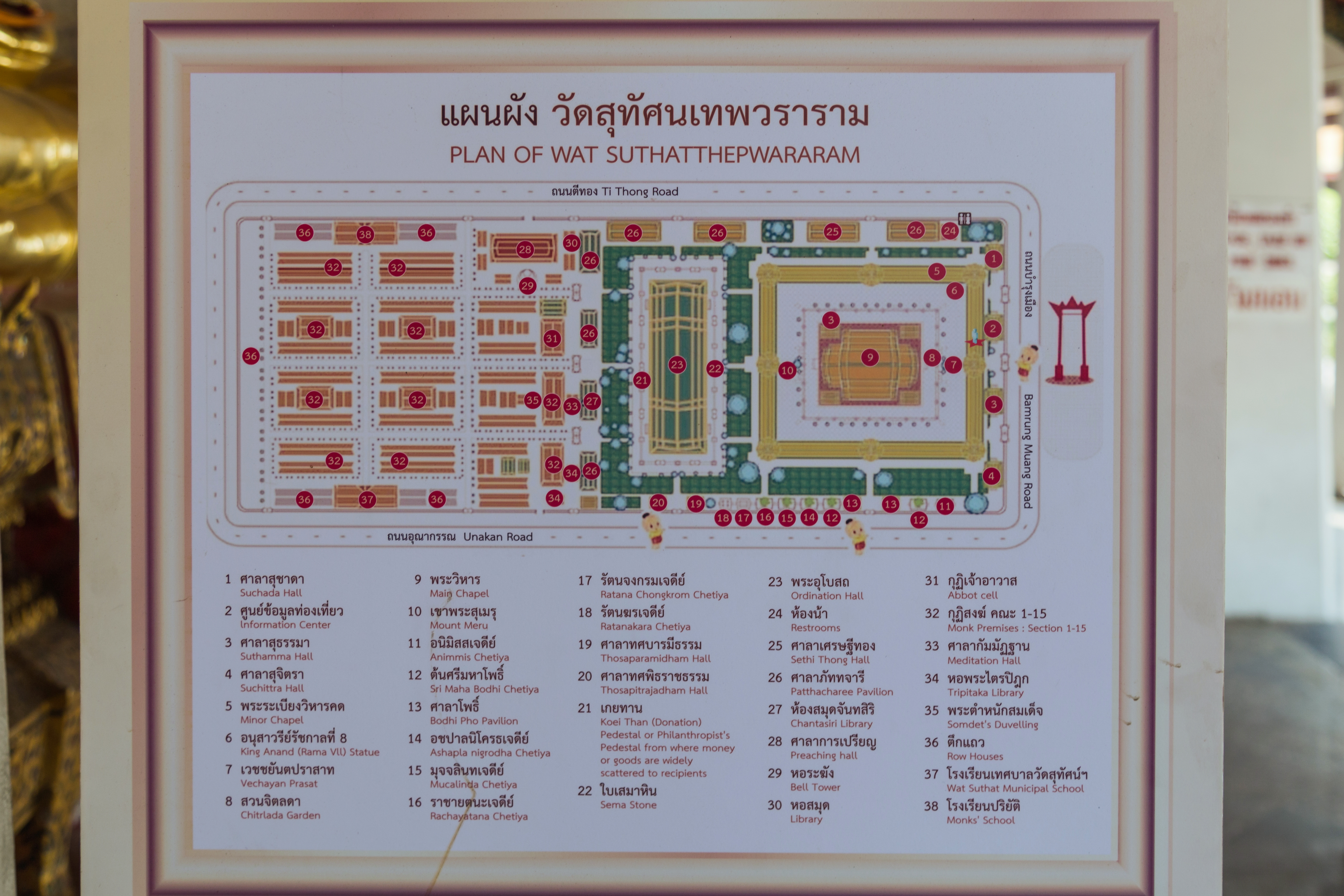
Plan of the Wat Suthat

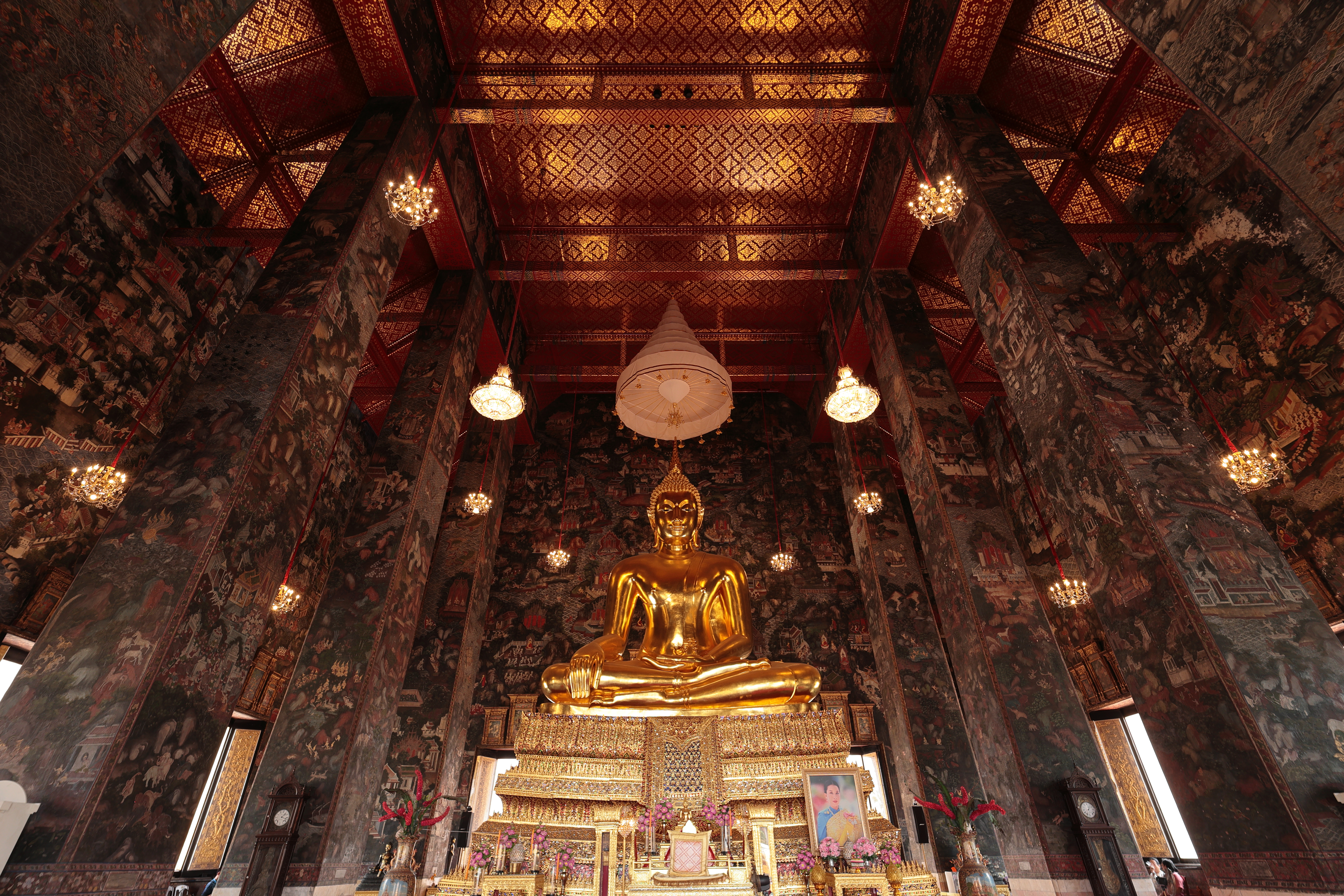
Interior of the vihāra

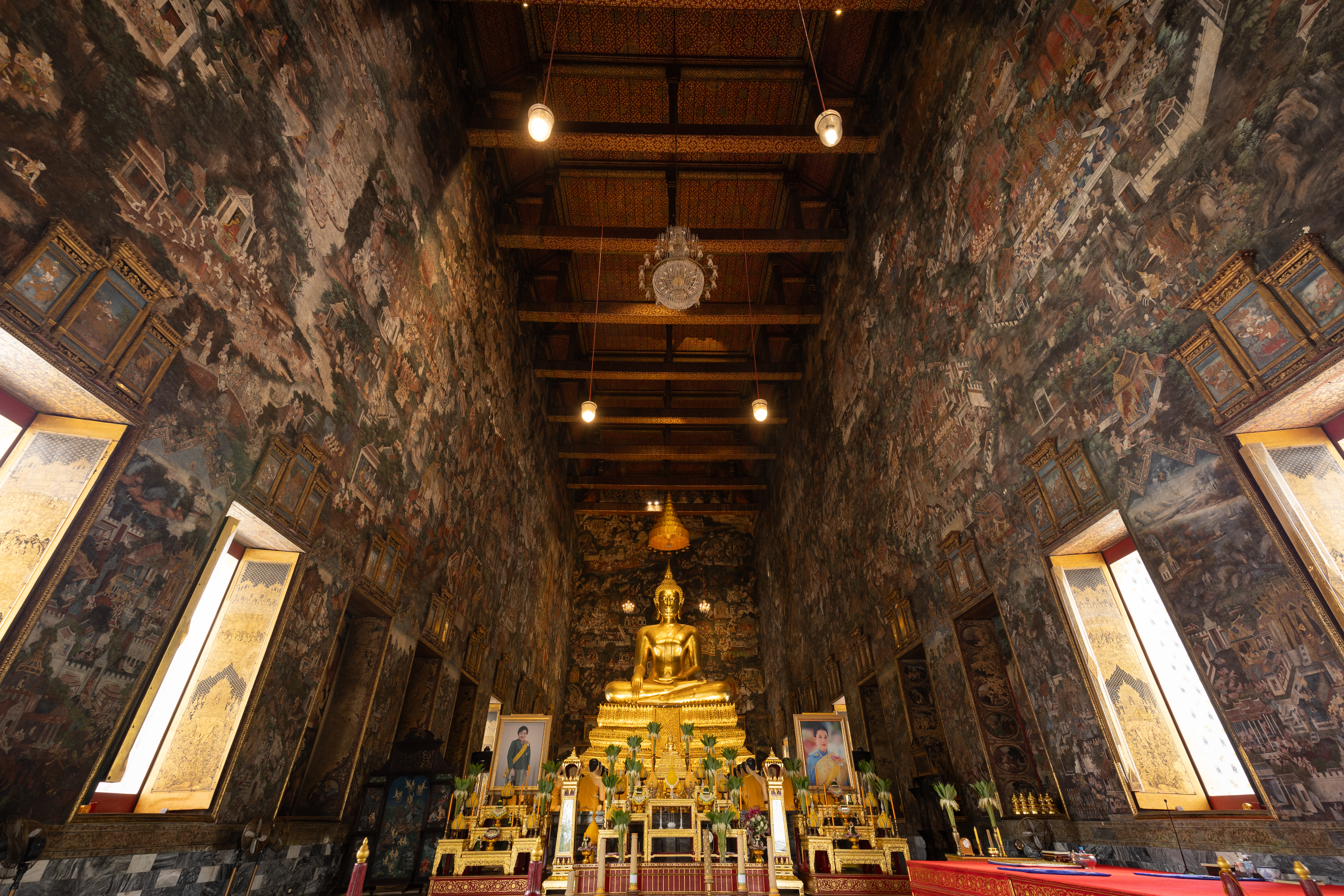
Interior of the ubosot

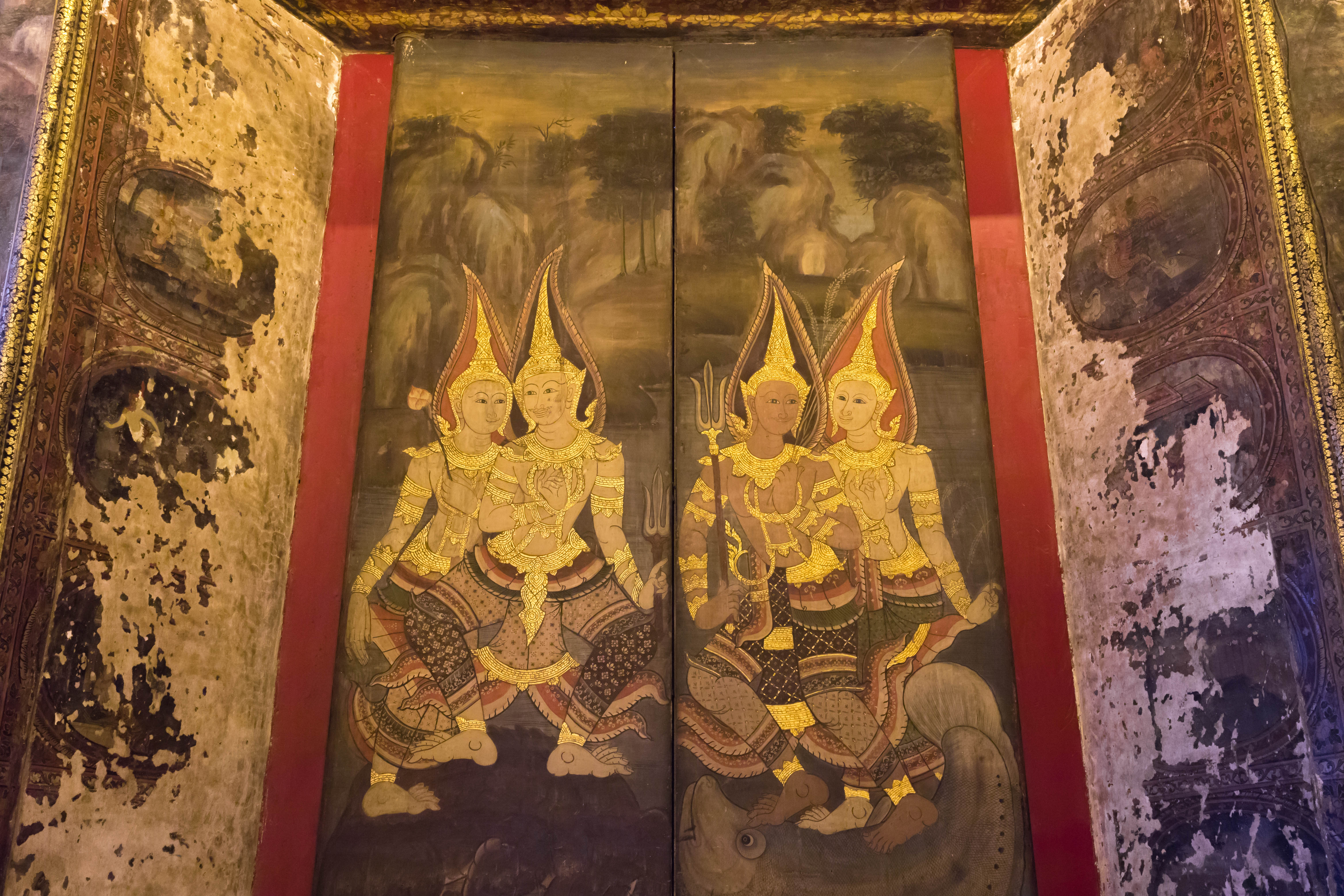
The doors of the ubosot

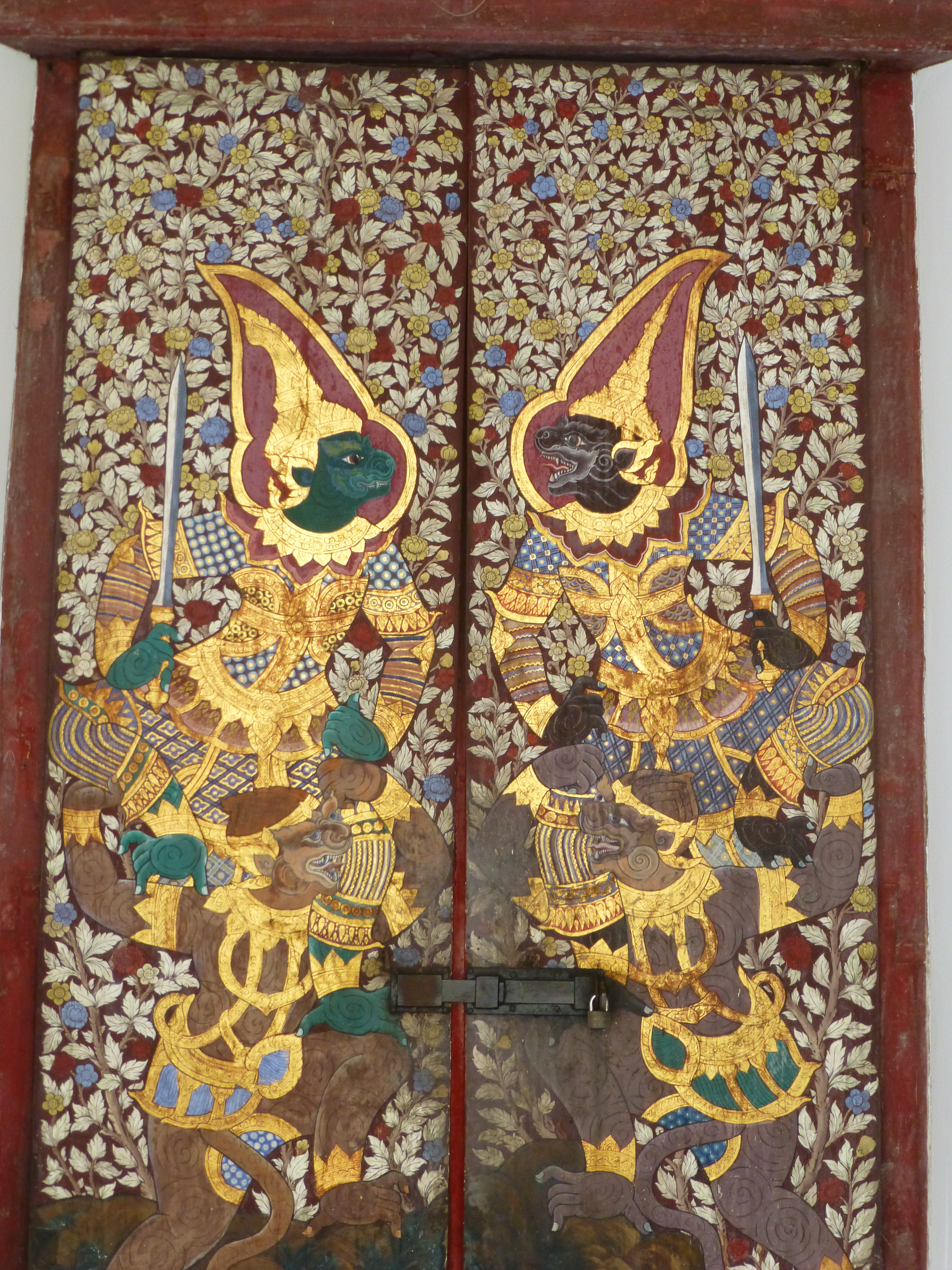
Windows

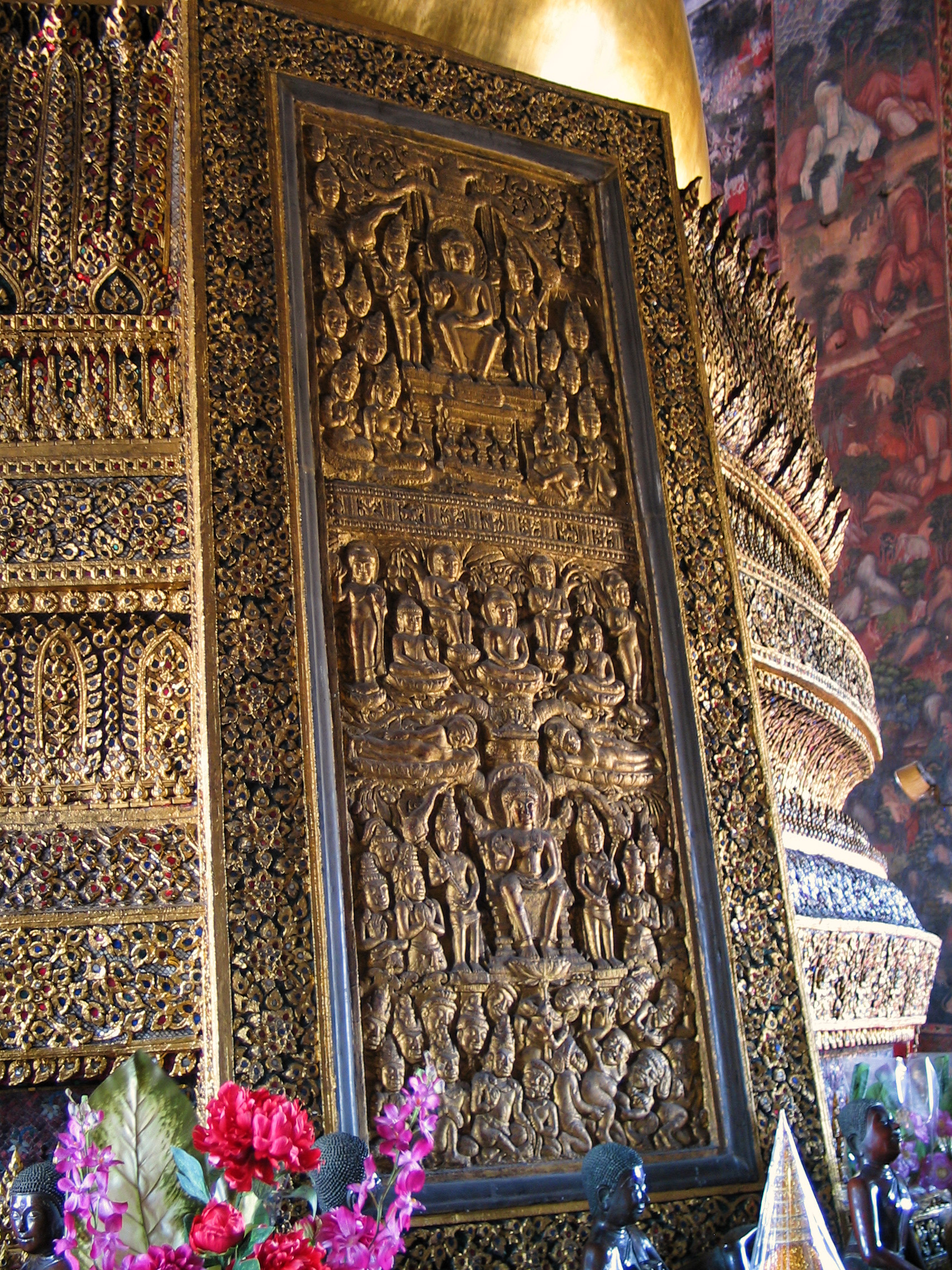
Dvaravati bas-relief at the rear base of Phra Sri Sakyamuni, the main Buddha image in the Wihan Luang of Wat Suthat.

== See also ==
- List of Buddhist temples in Thailand
- Devasathan Hindu temple nearby
