= Samran Rat =

Neighbourhood in Bangkok, Thailand

Samran Rat สำราญราษฎร์
- Khwaeng
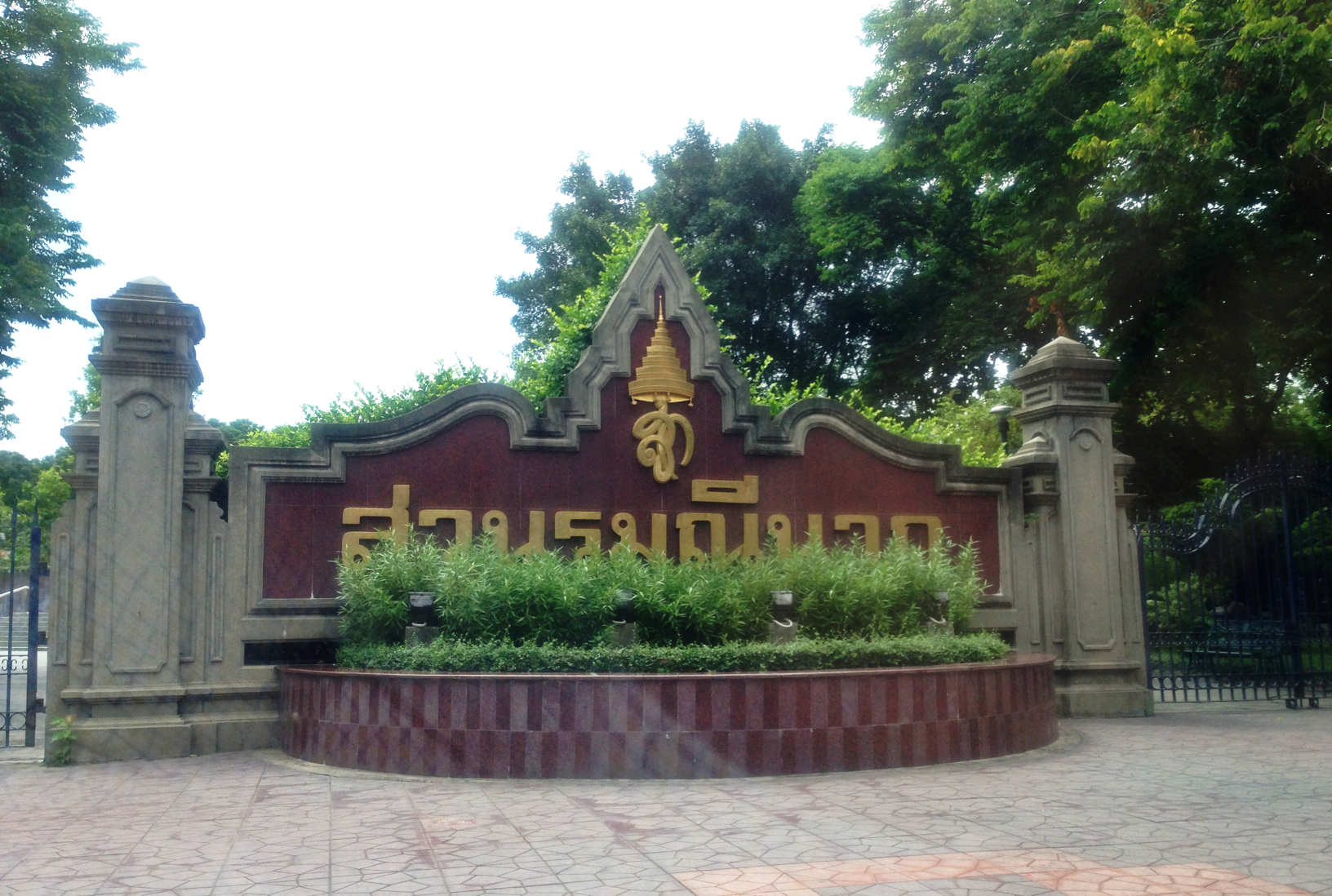
- Nameplate of Rommaninat Park (on Siriphong Road side)
- Etymology: "happy citizen"
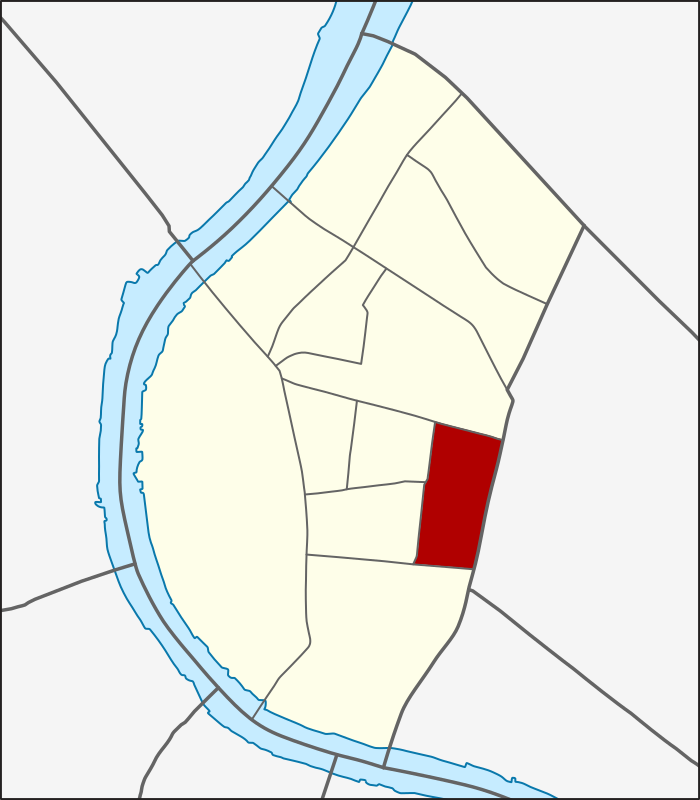
- Location in Phra Nakhon District
- Country: Thailand
- Province: Bangkok
- Khet: Phra Nakhon
- Named for: Pratu Phi

Area
  - Total: 0.230 km^{2} (0.089 sq mi)

Population (2021)
  - Total: 2,829
  - Density: 12,300/km^{2} (32,000/sq mi)
- Time zone: UTC+7 (ICT)
- Postal code: 10200
- Area code: 100104

Samran Rat (Thai: สำราญราษฎร์, pronounced [sǎm.rāːn râːt]), formerly and still colloquially known as Pratu Phi (ประตูผี, [prā.tūː pʰǐː]), is a historic neighbourhood in Bangkok. The neighbourhood roughly occupies the area of its namesake subdistrict and road junction in Phra Nakhon district.

== History ==
The name Pratu Phi means "ghost's gate", because the area was once the location of the city gate through which dead bodies were transported out of the fortified city for cremation during the early Rattanakosin period. Cremations usually took place at the nearby Wat Saket, located just across the city moat known as Khlong Rop Krung. The area was later officially renamed Samran Rat, meaning "happy citizen", in an effort to bring auspiciousness. However, the name Pratu Phi is still commonly used by many locals.

In modern times, Samran Rat is known as a hub of well-known eateries, especially for Thai street food at night. The area is packed with vendors and small restaurants offering popular dishes such as pad thai, yen ta fo, and salapao, as well as various traditional cafés. Among the most famous are Jay Fai, which received a Michelin star in 2017, and Thipsamai, renowned for its pad thai.

Samran Rat is also home to Thailand's first pawn shop, which has been operating since the reign of King Mongkut (Rama IV).

Behind Mahakan Fort, which was one of the original fortresses of Rattanakosin, stood the Mahakan Fort Community. Its residents had lived there since the early days of Bangkok, making it one of the city's oldest and most distinctive communities. However, in 2018, the government and the Bangkok Metropolitan Administration (BMA) ordered the demolition of their homes and the removal of all residents to clear the land for a new urban park.

== Geography ==
Samran Rat is considered to be the central part indented to the east of the Bangkok's old town zone or Rattanakosin Island. Within the area there are two main traffic junctions:

Samran Rat Intersection is a four-way junction where Bamrung Mueang and Maha Chai roads cross. From the intersection, Bamrung Mueang continues over the nearby Sommot Amonmak Bridge into the Ban Bat subdistrict of Pom Prap Sattru Phai district. The next junction along Bamrung Mueang is Maen Si.

Ruan Cham Junction is a T junction where Maha Chai and Luang roads meet. The point is known by this name because it used to be the location of the Special Bangkok Metropolitan Prison (ruan cham in Thai), built by the order of King Chulalongkorn (Rama V) in 1889. It served to detain and train prisoners so that they could become good citizens. Later in 1987, the Department of Corrections moved the prison from this place to where is now Khlong Prem Prison in Chatuchak district's Lat Yao subdistrict. BMA turned it into an urban park, named Rommaninat, to present to the Queen Sirikit on her fifth cycle birthday in 1992. Some of the buildings were developed into a Bangkok Corrections Museum.

== Surroundings (Note: Some places like Mahakan Fort, Wat Saket and Golden Mount, Wat Suthat, Giant Swing and Bangkok City Hall are not actually in this subdistrict, but are in adjacent areas such as Ban Bat, Sao Chingcha or Wat Ratchabophit.) ==
- Giant Swing
- Bangkok City Hall
- Devasathan
- Wat Suthat
- Mahakan Fort
- Wat Ratchanatdaram and Loha Prasat
- Wat Thepthidaram
- Wat Saket and Golden Mount
- Royal Pavilion Mahajetsadabadin and King Rama III Memorial
- Phan Fa Lilat Bridge
- King Prajadhipok Museum
- Samranrat Police Station
- Rommaninat Park
- Bangkok Corrections Museum
- Benjamarachalai School

== Gallery ==
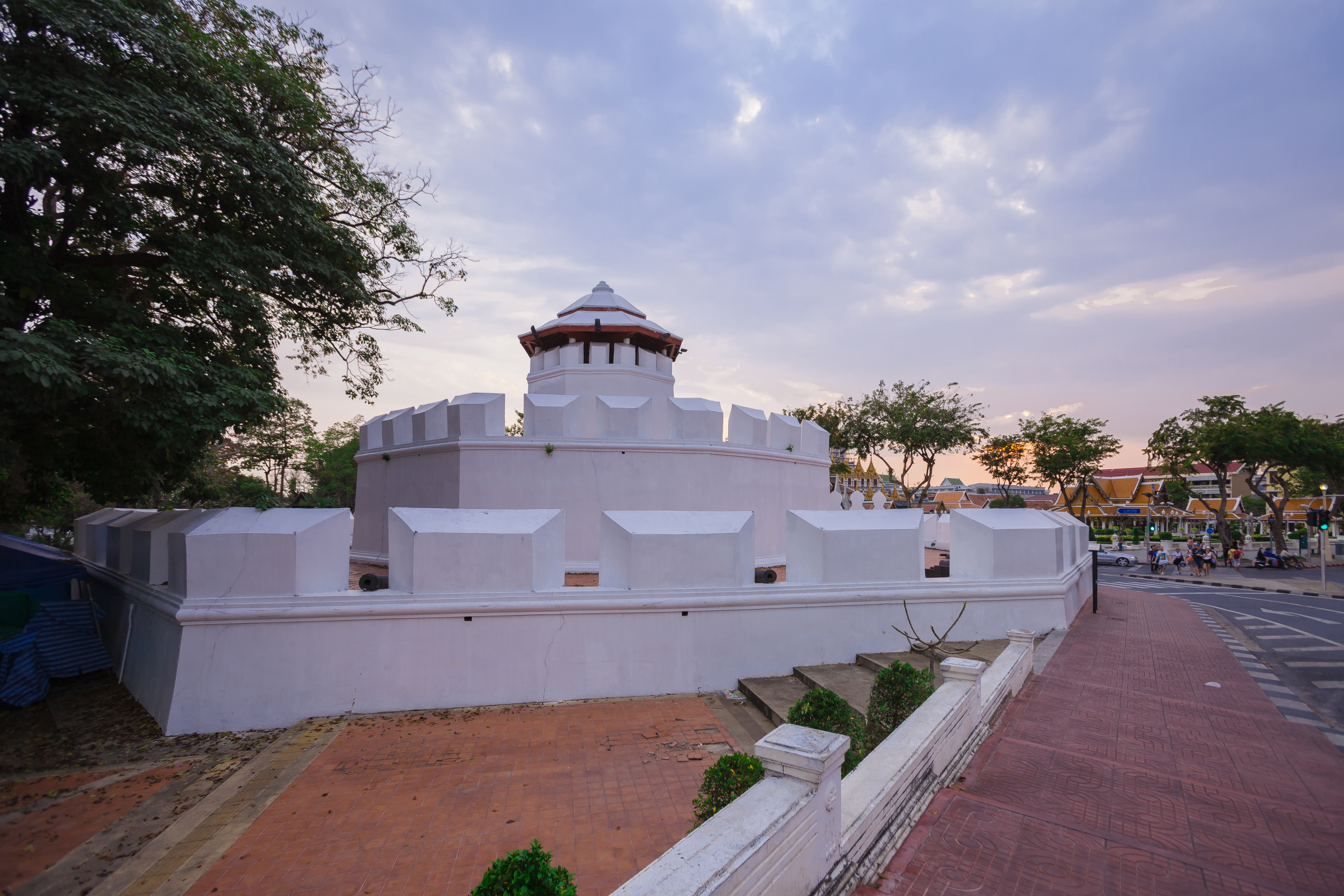
Fort Mahakan one of landmarks of Samran Rat area (although in truth, it is located in neighbouring Bowon Niwet subdistrict

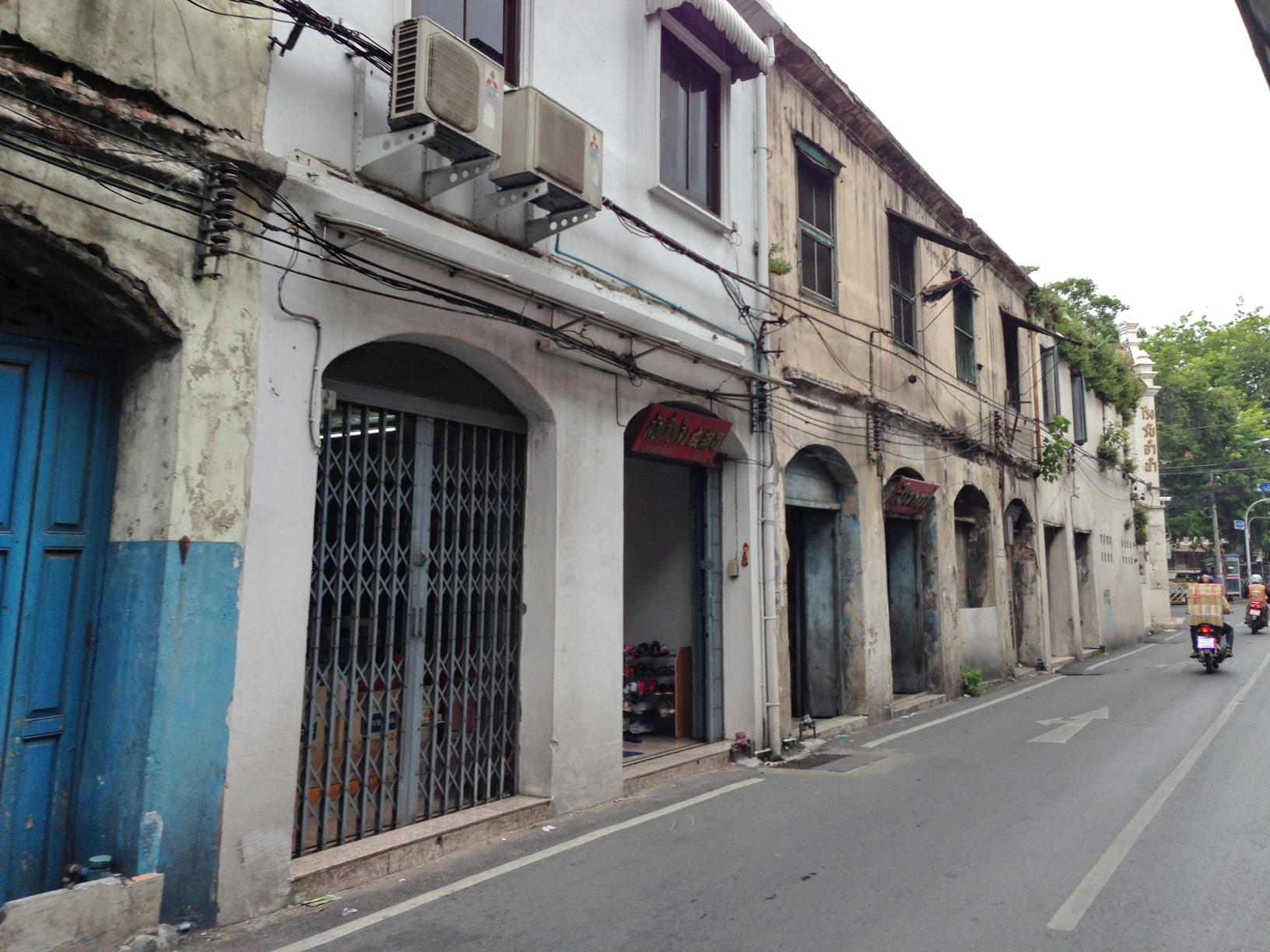
Shophouses along Bamrung Mueang road, Samran Rat intersection is ahead

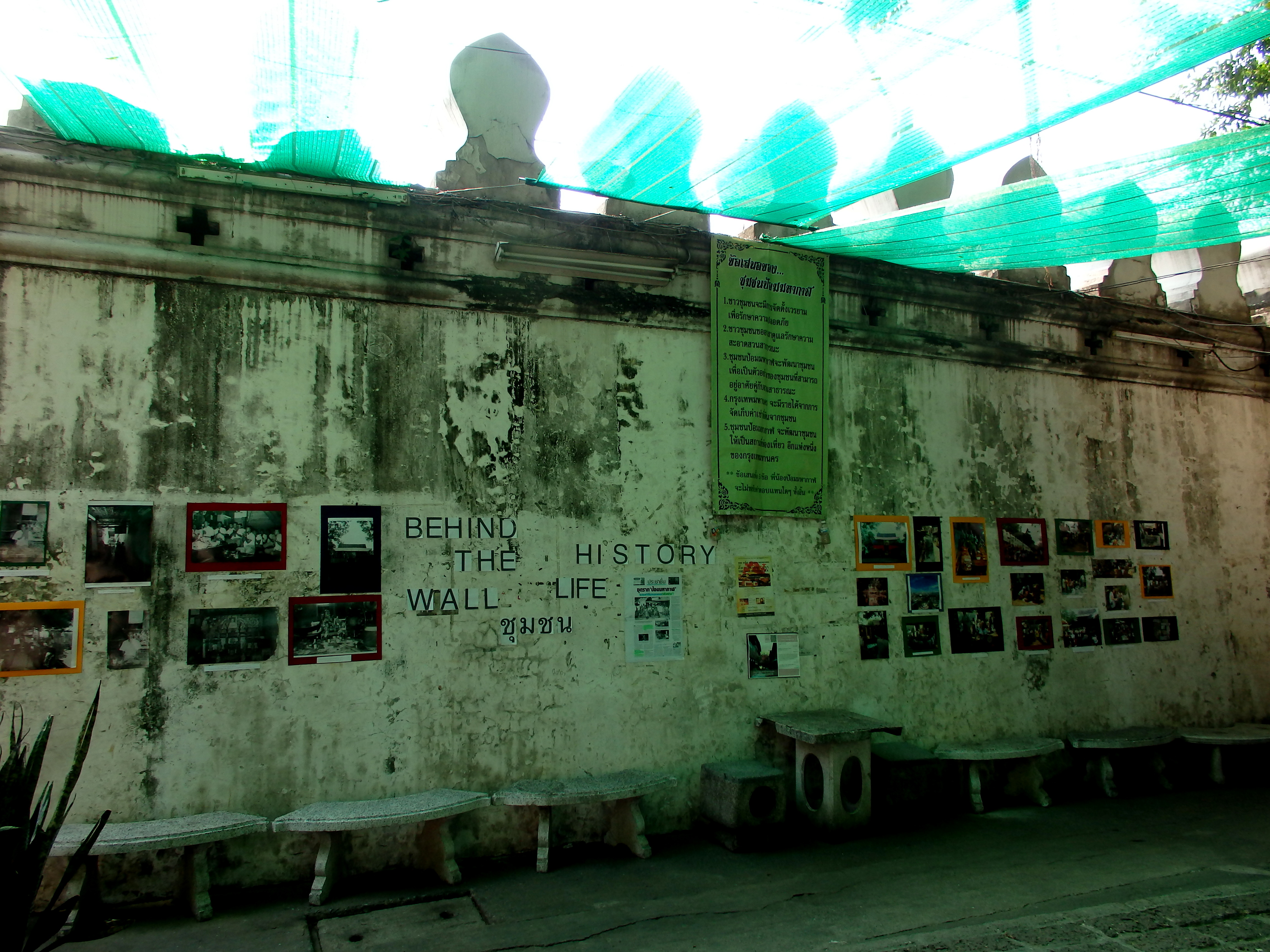
Community behind the Mahakan Fort

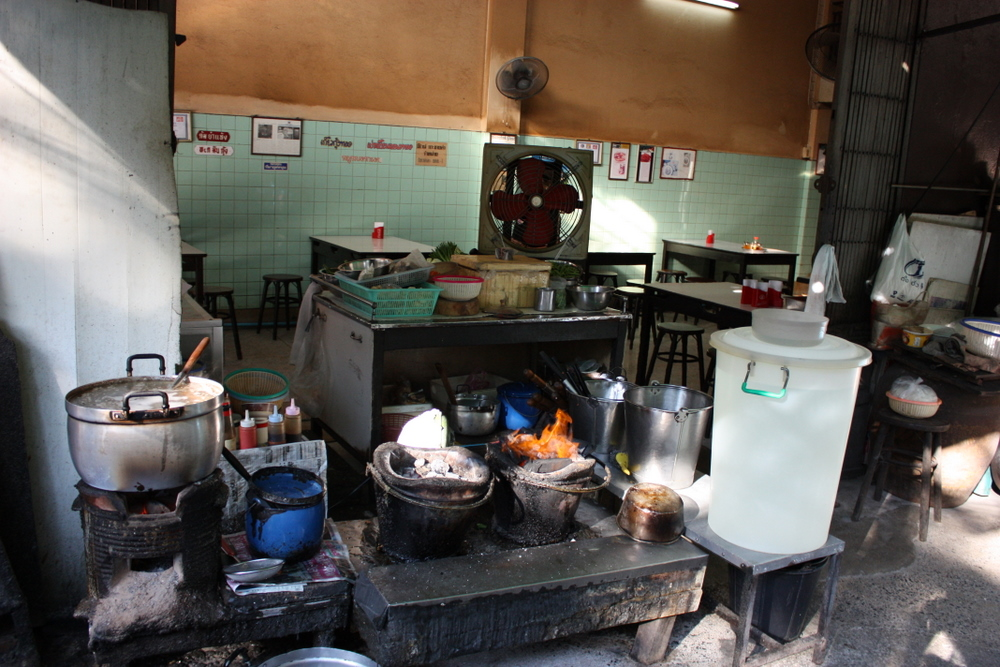
Cooking area of Jay Fai restaurant

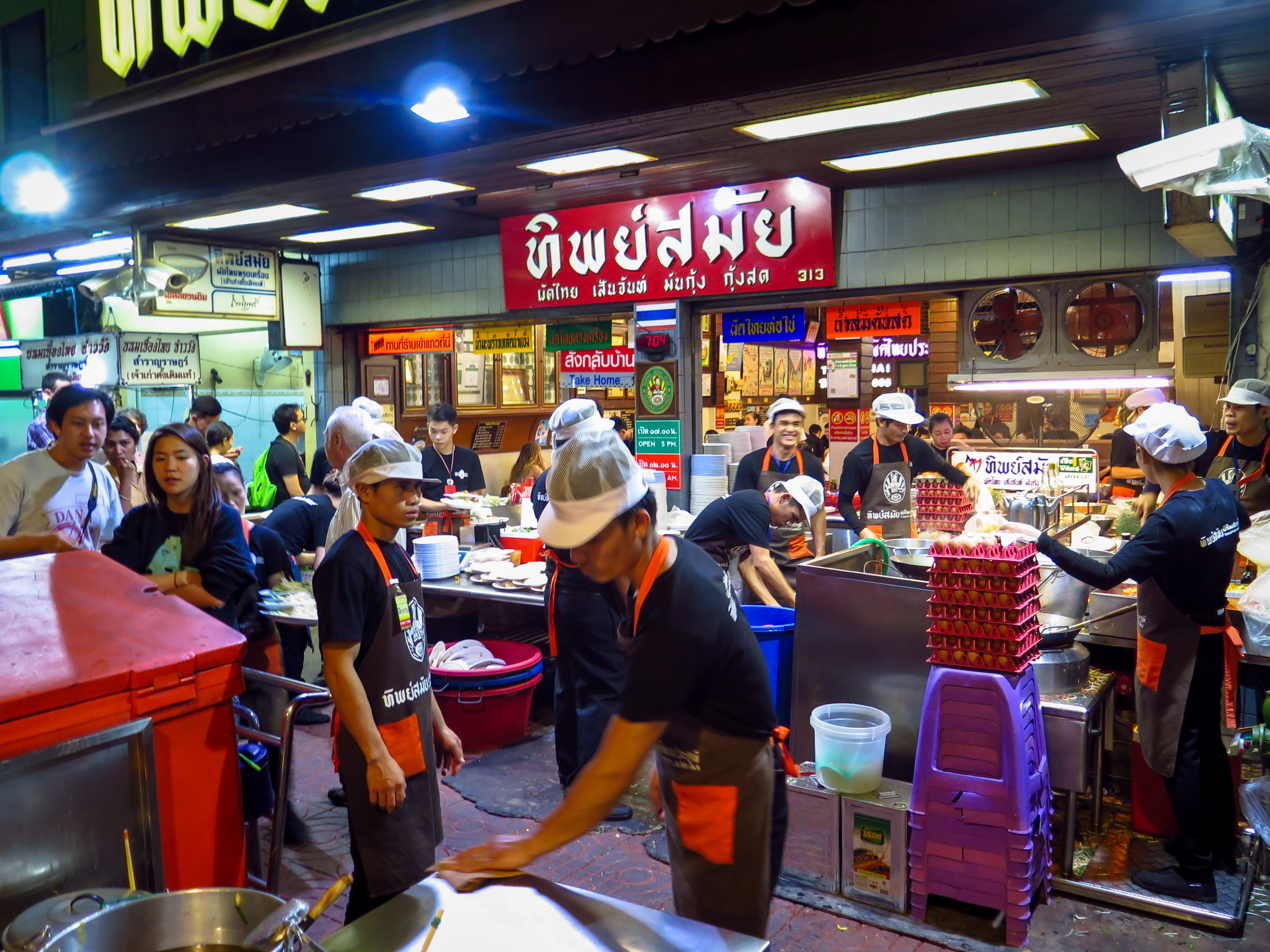
Thipsamai pad thai restaurant

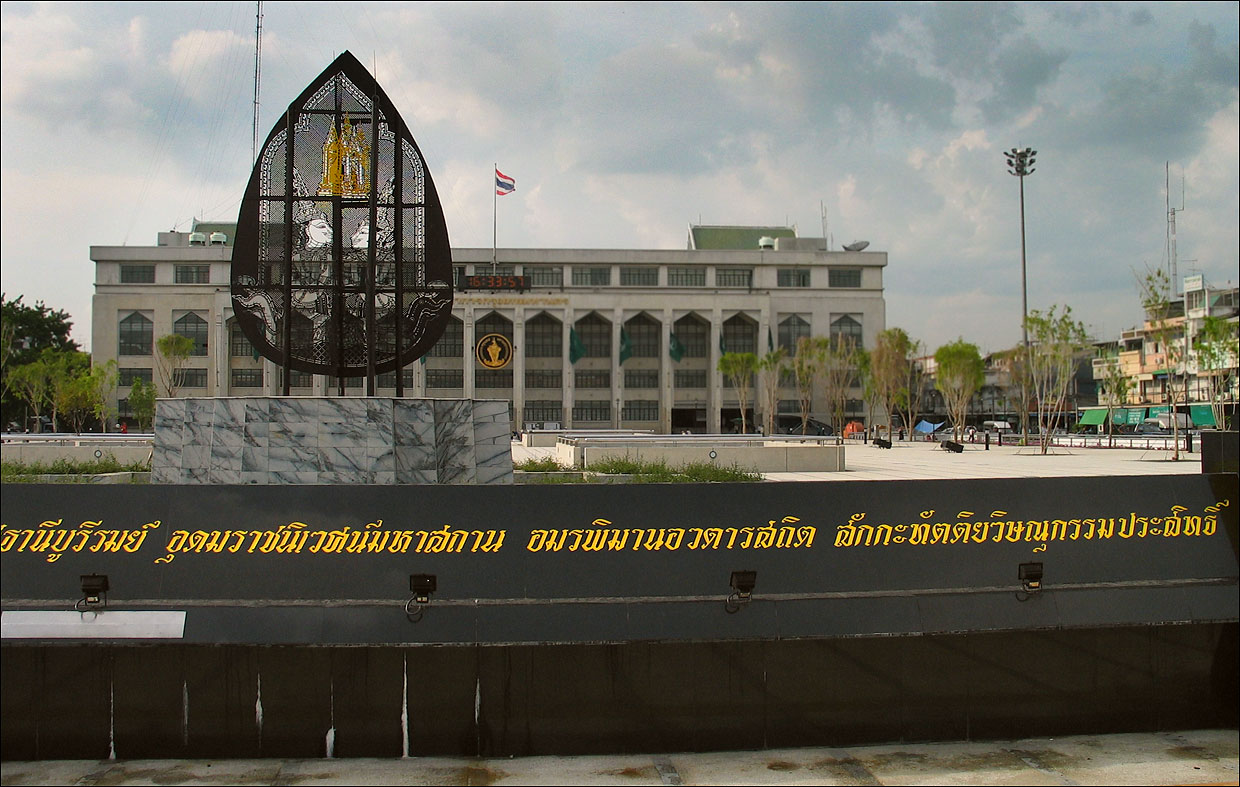
Bangkok City Hall

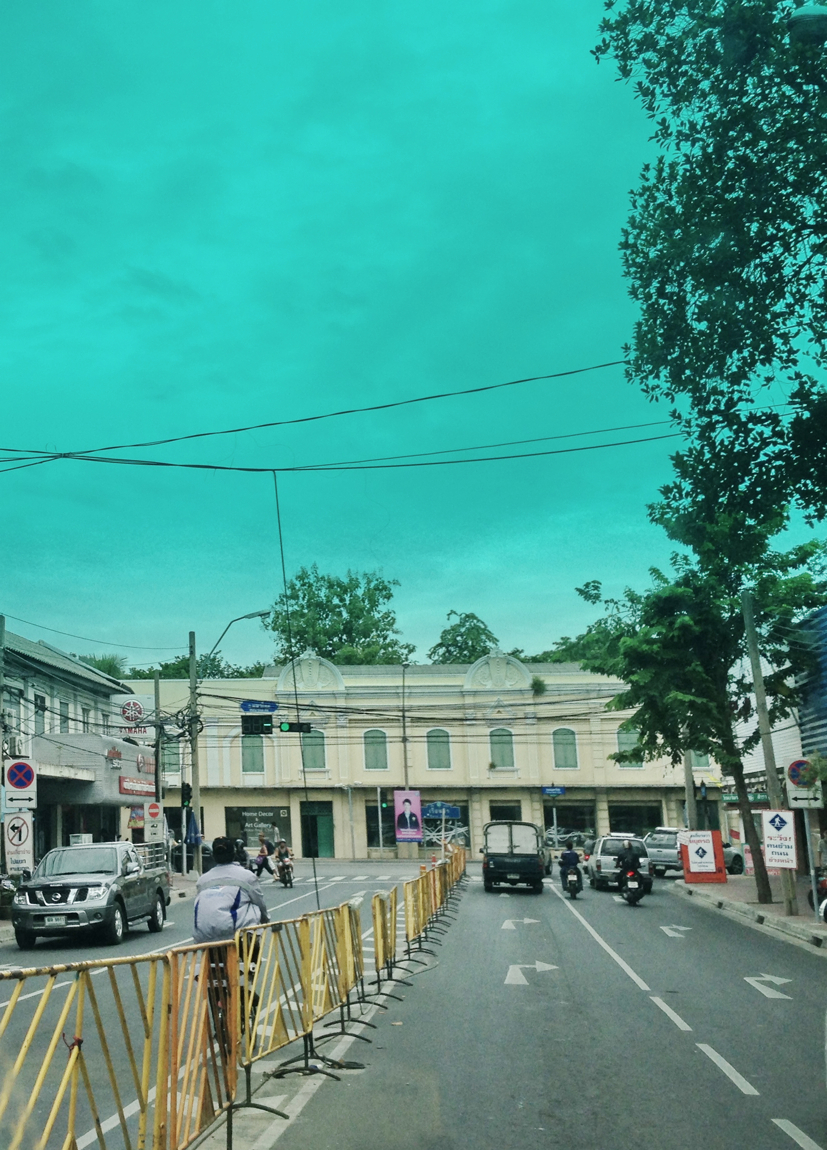
Ruan Cham Junction (seen from Luang road, Bangkok Corrections Museum is ahead)
