= Maen Si =

Coordinates: 13°45′06.78″N 100°30′31.50″E

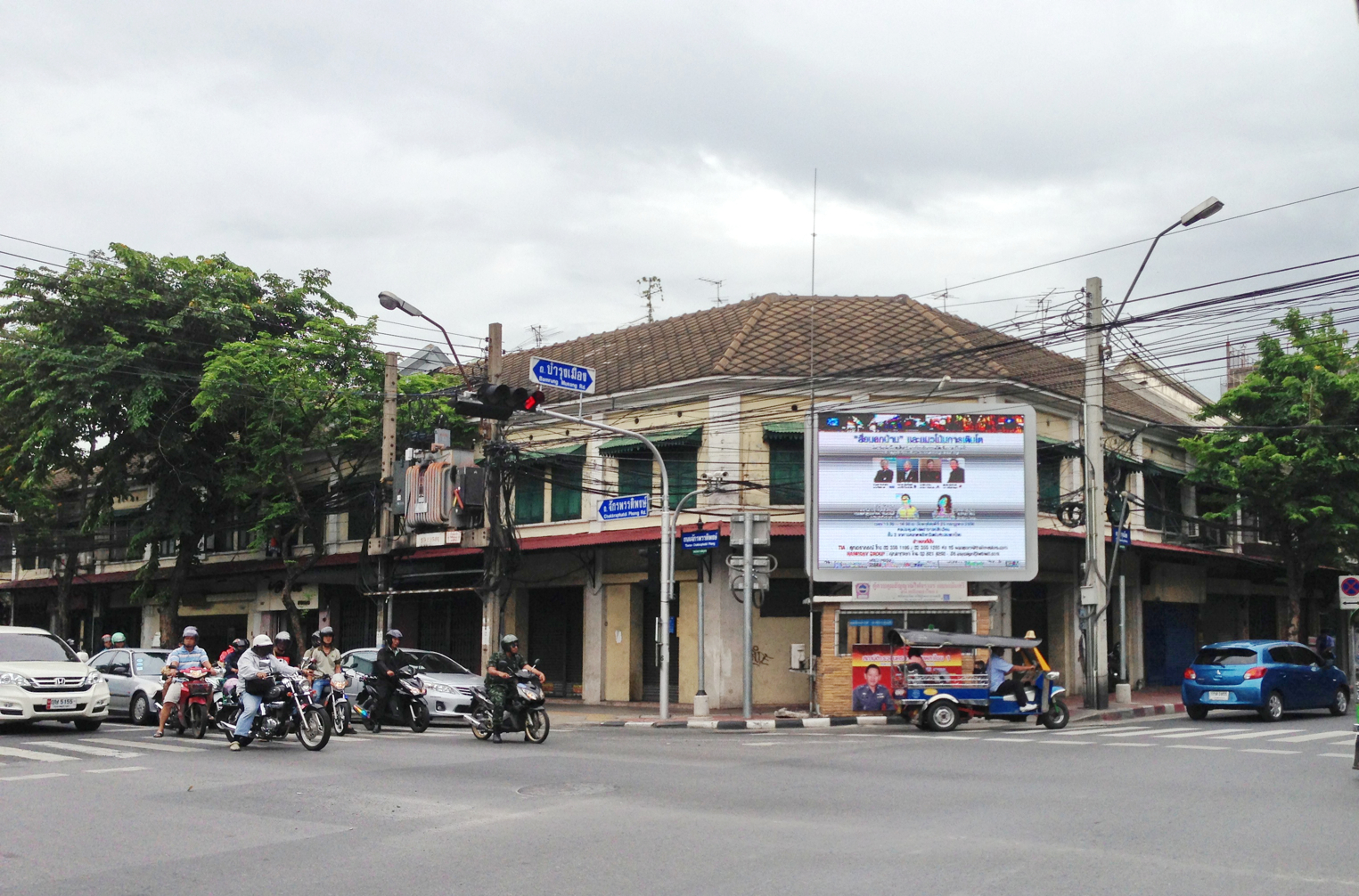
Maen Si intersection

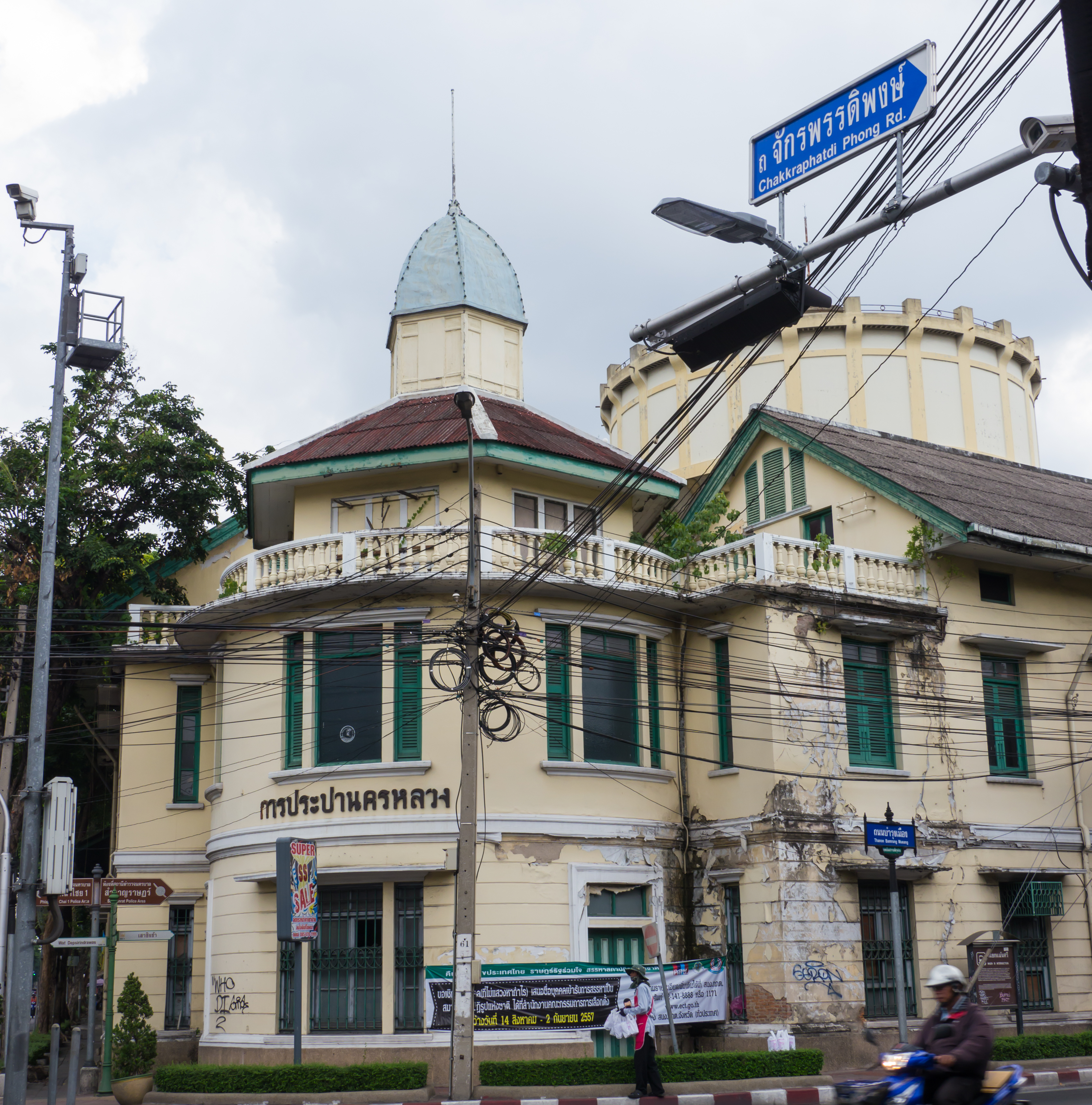
the old Metropolitan Waterworks Authority (MWA)

Maen Si (Thai: แม้นศรี, pronounced [mɛ́ːn sǐː]) is an intersection where Bamrung Mueang, Worachak, and Chakkraphatdi Phong roads meet, located at the tripoint of Ban Bat, Wat Thep Sirin, and Khlong Mahanak sub-districts in Pom Prap Sattru Phai district, Bangkok. It lies just next to Samran Rat (also known as Pratu Phi) on Bamrung Mueang Road, near Wat Saket.

The name "Maen Si" comes from Mom Ham Maen, a consort of Prince Bhanurangsi Savangwongse (also known as Prince Bhanubandhu Vongsevoradej). "Maen" was her given name, while "Si" is a term for women. She was the daughter of Chao Phraya Surawongwaiwat (Worn Bunnag), a member of the influential Bunnag family. When she died, the prince was deeply grieved, as she was his beloved wife. He organized a grand funeral and used part of the contributions to build a small memorial bridge across a canal on Bamrung Mueang Road, naming it Saphan Maen Si (สะพานแม้นศรี, lit. 'Maen Si Bridge'). Later, as the roads were expanded, the bridge was demolished, but its name has endured as the name of the intersection.

A prominent landmark at the Maen Si intersection is the building of the Metropolitan Waterworks Authority (MWA), located on the Bamrung Mueang side. Built in 1914 during the early reign of King Vajiravudh (Rama VI), it served as the first MWA headquarters and marked the beginning of Thailand's water supply system. More than a century later, the building still stands, notable for its European architectural influence and recognized as one of Bangkok's historic structures.

Maen Si is also home to a Thai-Tavoyan community. Their ancestors fled from Dawei (formerly Tavoy) in the Tanintharyi region to Rattanakosin (present-day Bangkok) during the reign of King Phutthayotfa Chulalok (Rama I). Evidence of this heritage can be seen in Trok Thawai (ตรอกทวาย, lit. 'Tavoy Alley'), now officially known as Soi Maen Si 1. (ซอยแม้นศรี 1)
