= Rommaninat Park =

Public park in Bangkok, Thailand

Coordinates: 13°44′55.67″N 100°30′10.78″E

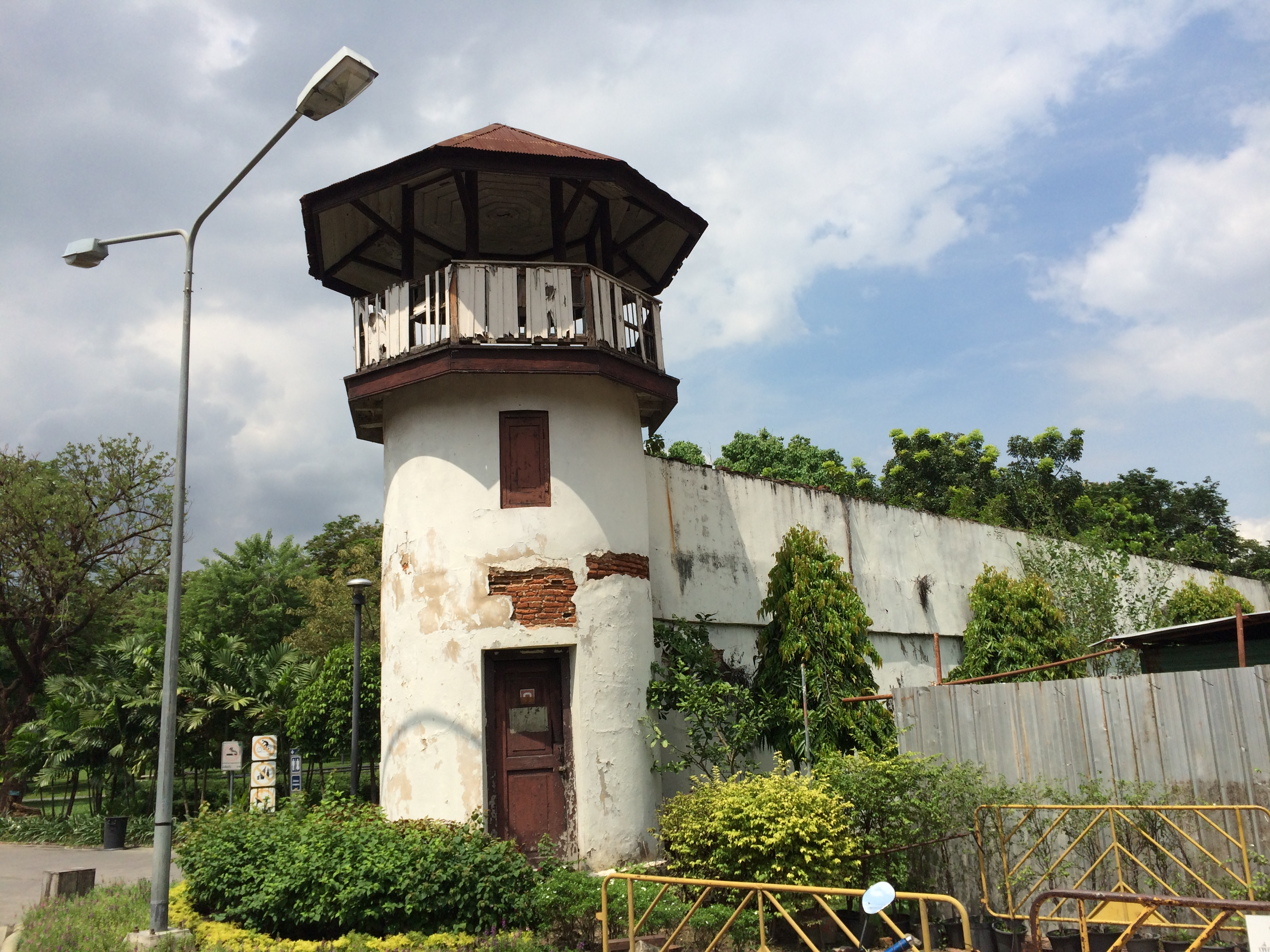
- Observation tower
- Interactive map of Rommaninat Park
- Type: Public park
- Location: Samran Rat, Phra Nakhon, Bangkok
- Area: 11 acres (4.5 ha)
- Created: 1993
- Operator: Bangkok Metropolitan Administration
- Status: Open
- Public transit: MRT MRT Sam Yot station BMTA Bus / Affiliated bus Taxi / Motorcycle taxi

Rommaninat Park or Romaneenart Park (Thai: สวนรมณีนาถ, pronounced [sǔan rōm.mā.nīː.nâːt], lit. 'delightful park of woman who was regent'), colloquially known as Khuk Kao (คุกเก่า, pronounced [khúk kàw], lit. 'old prison'), is a public park located in the Samran Rat neighborhood of Bangkok, Thailand, in the Phra Nakhon district. The park covers an area of nearly 12 acres. It was built on the occasion of Queen Sirikit's 60th birthday, in 1992.

The park is built on the side of what used to be Klong Prem Prison, on the royal initiative of King Chulalongkorn (Rama V) in 1890, modeled after HM Prison Brixton in the London Borough of Lambeth, in England. The park also houses the Bangkok Corrections Museum.
