= Ban Bat =

Coordinates: 13°45′3.49″N 100°30′24.13″E

Ban Bat บ้านบาตร
- Khwaeng
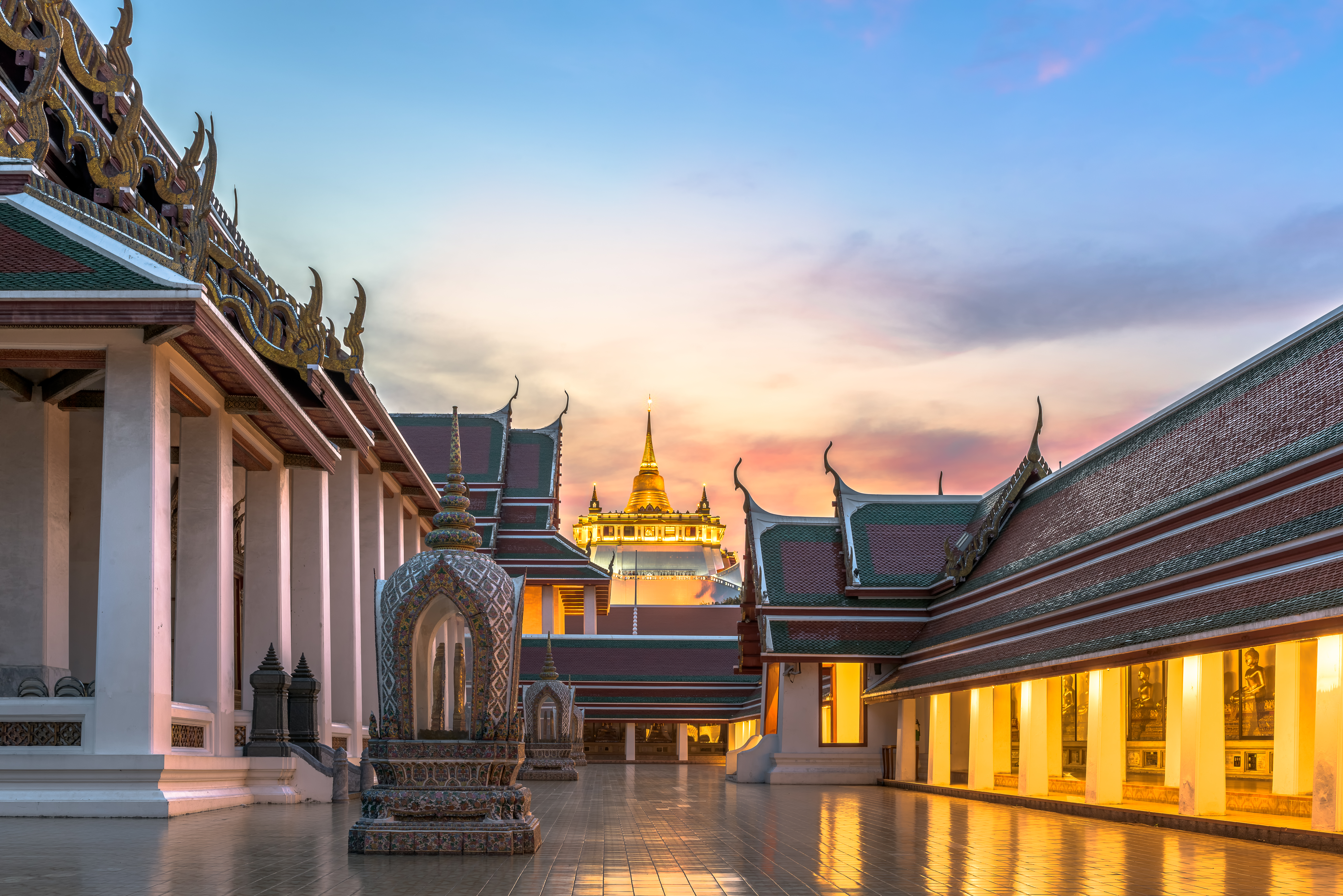
- Wat Saket with Golden Mount in the distance

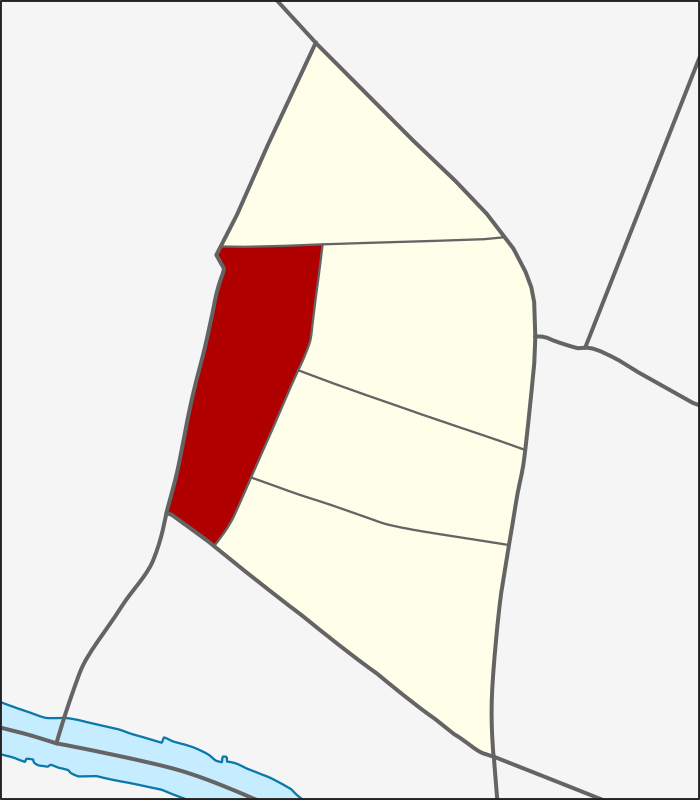
- Location in Pom Prap Sattru Phai District
- Country: Thailand
- Province: Bangkok
- Khet: Pom Prap Sattru Phai

Area
  - Total: 0.251 km^{2} (0.097 sq mi)

Population (2019)
  - Total: 6,613
- Time zone: UTC+7 (ICT)
- Postal code: 10100
- TIS 1099: 100804

Ban Bat (Thai: บ้านบาตร, RTGS: Ban Bat, pronounced [bâːn bàːt]; also spelled Banbatt) is one of the five sub-districts (khwaeng) in the Pom Prap Sattru Phai District of Bangkok of Thailand. It has an area of 0.316 km^{2} (0.122 sq mi). Some parts of the northern area are on the Khlong Maha Nak canal. The west side borders the Samran Rat Sub-district of Phra Nakhon District.

== History & toponymy ==
The name Ban Bat means "alms bowl community".

Locals believe that their ancestors immigrated from Ayutthaya after its fall in 1767. In 1782, Phyra Phutthayotfa Chulalok (Rama I) established what is today's Bangkok. The refugees settled there, but the date of their migration is unclear. They were known for creating monk's alms bowls, which required handcrafting and manual labor. This tradition has lasted to the modern day. Locals have established the Ban Bat Community, a group that preserves the monk's alms bowl tradition and sells alms bowls to visitors as souvenirs.

Additionally, in 1883, during the King Chulalongkorn (Rama V)'s reign, it was recorded that the community in Ban Bat had a variety of occupations, one of which was the weaving of O (โอ, pronounced [ʔoː]), a type of container similar to a large bowl or cup, which was made of both lacquerware and woven materials.

Ban Bat was also home to the house and band of Luang Pradit Pairoh, who was regarded as a master of traditional Thai music.

== Places ==
Another old community, Ban Dokmai, is nearby. It has a tradition of making fireworks ("firework" in Thai called dokmai fai (Thai: ดอกไม้ไฟ; RTGS: dok mai fai; literally 'flame flower'). Similar to the alms bowls of Ban Bat, this tradition may be lost.

Other points of interest include the following:

- Wat Saket and Golden Mount
- Maen Si Intersection
- Sommot Amon Mak Bridge
- Ban Dokmai Palace of Prince Purachatra Jayakara
- Khlong Thom

Moreover, the area around Wat Saket is also a large source of the shops that line a comprehensive range of wood products and handicraft. Currently, some of them have moved to settle in Bang Pho, Bang Sue District.
