= Wat Bophit Phimuk =

Buddhist temple in Bangkok, Thailand

Coordinates: 13°44′30.48″N 100°30′06.48″E

Wat Bophit Phimuk Worawihan
- วัดบพิตรพิมุข
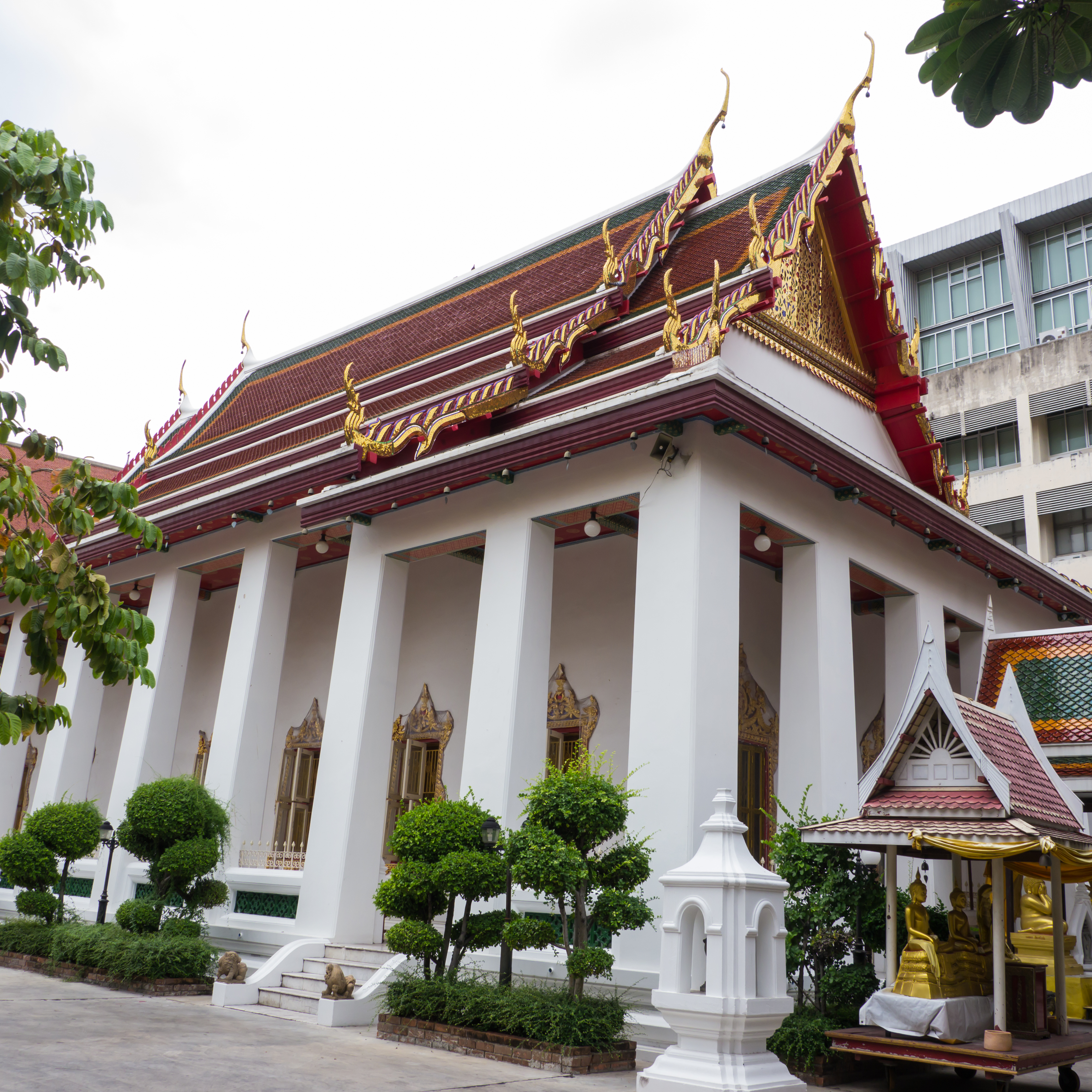
- Main hall

- Location within Thailand

Religion
- Affiliation: Buddhism (Theravāda: Mahā Nikāya)
- Region: central Thailand
- Status: Second grade royal temple

Location
- Location: 226 Chakkrawat Rd, Chakkrawat, Samphanthawong, Bangkok
- Country: Thailand
- Interactive map of Wat Bophit Phimuk Worawihan

Architecture
- Founder: Unknown

Website
- www.watbopitpimuk.com

Wat Bophit Phimuk (Thai: วัดบพิตรพิมุขวรวิหาร) (or written as Wat Bopitpimukh) is a second grade royal temple in Bangkok, located on Chakkrawat Road, Chakkrawat Sub-district, Samphanthawong District near the foot of Phra Pok Klao Bridge on periphery of Chakkrawat Sub-district, Samphanthawong District and Wang Burapha Phirom Sub-district, Phra Nakhon District. Regarded as another Thai temple located in the area known as Chinatown, in addition to the Wat Traimit or the Wat Chakkrawat.

It is an ancient civil temple that has existed since the Ayutthaya period and named "Wat Teen Lane" (วัดตีนเลน) or "Wat Choeng Lane" (วัดเชิงเลน), due to the temple's location near the east bank of the Chao Phraya River where the area had an abundance of mud (lane in Thai means mud). This temple does not know who created it. Assumed that it would be built after the King Narai's reign, because it does not appear in Thonburi map in those days.

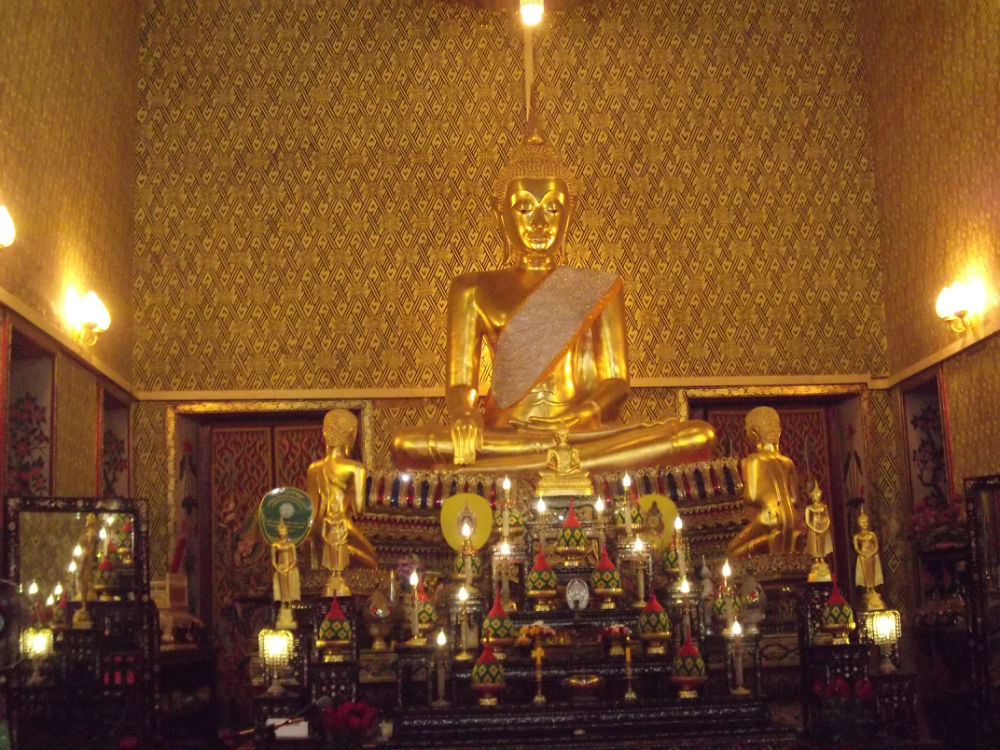
Principal Buddha statue

Around 1781 during the King Phutthayotfa Chulalok (Rama I)'s reign, Prince Anurak Devesh who was a king's cousin renovated the entire temple and the king named it Wat Bophit Phimuk to honour him. In the King Phutthaloetla Naphalai (Rama II)'s reign, an epidemic of cholera killed many people and their bodies were piled in the temple's graveyard alike to Wat Saket and Wat Sangwet. In King Nangklao (Rama III)'s reign, the wood structures were demolished and replaced by masonry buildings. Later, King Mongkut (Rama IV) had the temple restored again and a teak wooden pavilion was built with the design of the King's emblem, a royal crown on a pedestal guarded by mythical creatures. This still appears on the front and side of the pavilion. The monks' dwellings reflex a combination of Thai and Chinese architectural styles.

The principal Buddha statue of the temple is Buddha statue in Māravijaya posture namely "Phra Sam Phuttha Bophit" (พระสัมพุทธบพิตร) enshrined within the main hall.
