= Sommot Amon Mak Bridge =

Bridge in Bangkok

Sommot Amon Mak Bridge สะพานสมมตอมรมารค
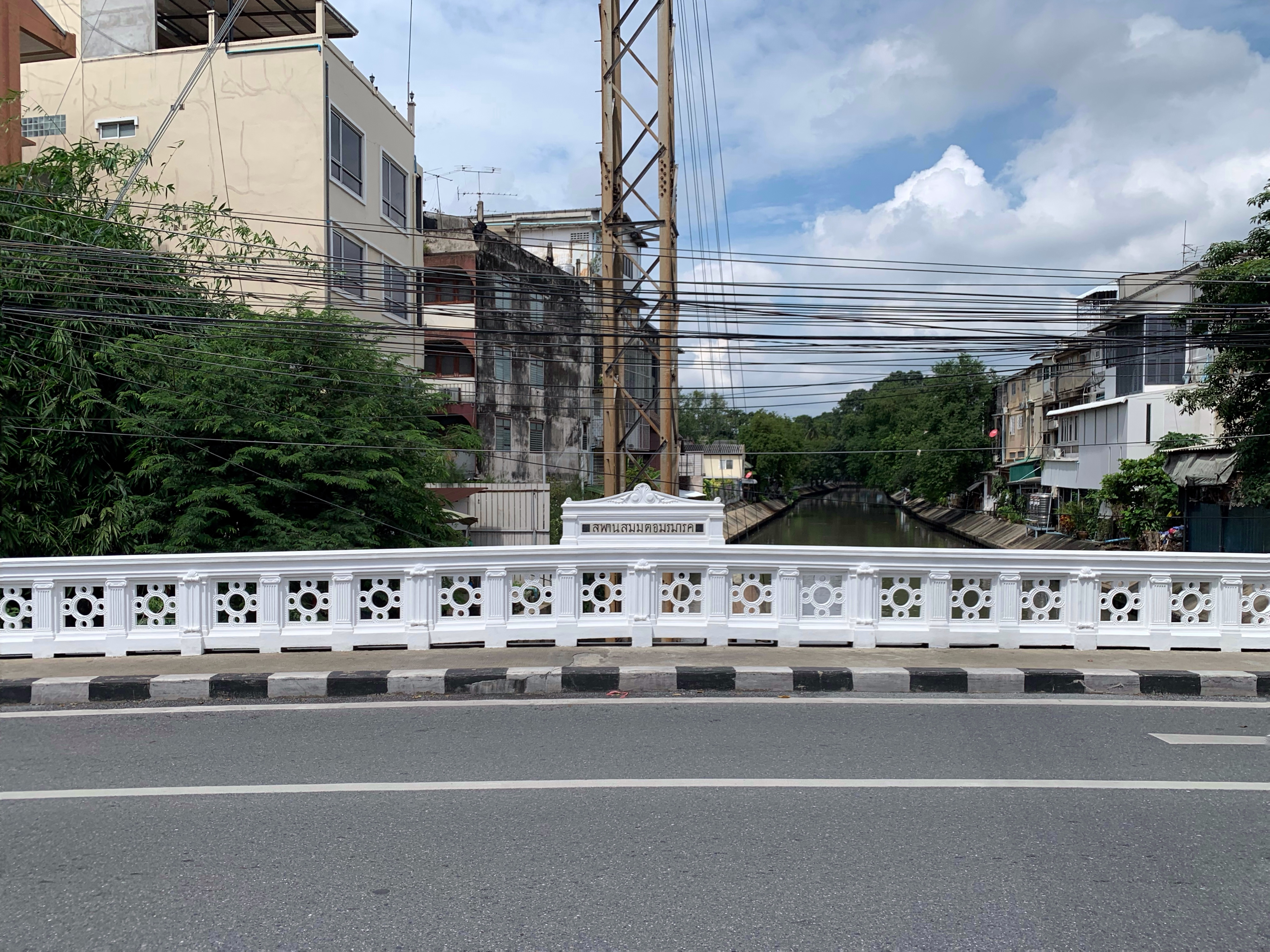
- Coordinates: 13°45′7.96″N 100°30′18.78″E
- Carries: Bamrung Mueang Road
- Crosses: Khlong Bang Lamphu
- Locale: Samran Rat Sub-District, Phra Nakhon District and Ban Bat Sub-district, Pom Prap Sattru Phai, Bangkok, Thailand
- Official name: Sommot Amon Mak Bridge
- Other name: Saphan Lek Pratu Phi (Steel Bridge at Ghost Gate)
- Maintained by: Bangkok Metropolitan Administration (BMA)

Characteristics
- Design: Ionic
- Total length: 23 m (75.5 ft)
- Width: 75 m (246.1 ft)

Location
- Interactive map of Sommot Amon Mak Bridge

Sommot Amon Mak Bridge (Thai: สะพานสมมตอมรมารค, RTGS: Saphan Sommot Amon Mak, pronounced [sā.pʰāːn sǒm.mót ʔā.mɔ̄ːn mâːk]) is a historic bridge over a khlong (canal) in Bangkok. It is located on Bamrung Mueang Road, between Samran Rat Sub-district of Phra Nakhon District and Ban Bat Sub-district of Pom Prap Sattru Phai District.

The bridge is considered another of Bangkok's Saphan Lek ("steel bridges"), similar to Damrong Sathit and Phitthaya Sathian Bridges. Originally built as a steel structure that could be disassembled to allow boats to pass, it was called "Saphan Lek Pratu Phi", named after the area known as Pratu Phi ("Ghost Gate").

In the early Rattanakosin period, this area had a gate used to transport corpses out of the inner city or the Grand Palace. It lies to the east, which aligns with a traditional belief that the east is the direction in which spirits travel.

Later, during the reign of King Chulalongkorn (Rama V), after the bridge had deteriorated over time, he ordered the Department of Public Works to rebuild it as a concrete bridge. It was officially renamed "Sommot Amon Mak", which roughly translates to "Path of the Immortal", referring to a divine or royal path, in honour of Prince Sawasdiprawat.

A striking feature of the bridge is its Ionic-style banisters. It has been registered as one of Bangkok's historic monuments.

At the end of the bridge on the Pom Prap Sattru Phai side is a road junction called "Men Pun Intersection", which literally means "cement crematorium intersection". The area is located near Wat Saket.

During the reigns of King Phutthaloetla Naphalai (Rama II) and King Nangklao (Rama III), Bangkok suffered from severe cholera outbreaks. With a large number of bodies that could not be cremated in time, many were left along roadsides and temple grounds to be consumed by vultures, creating an unsettling scene that came to symbolize the horrors of that era.

Wat Saket was the main cremation site at the time, including a nearby crematorium built from cement. Although the crematorium has since been demolished, its name lives on and remains the official name of the intersection today.
