= Thipsamai =

Restaurant in Bangkok, Thailand

Coordinates: 13.754816°N 100.504108°E

Thipsamai ทิพย์สมัย
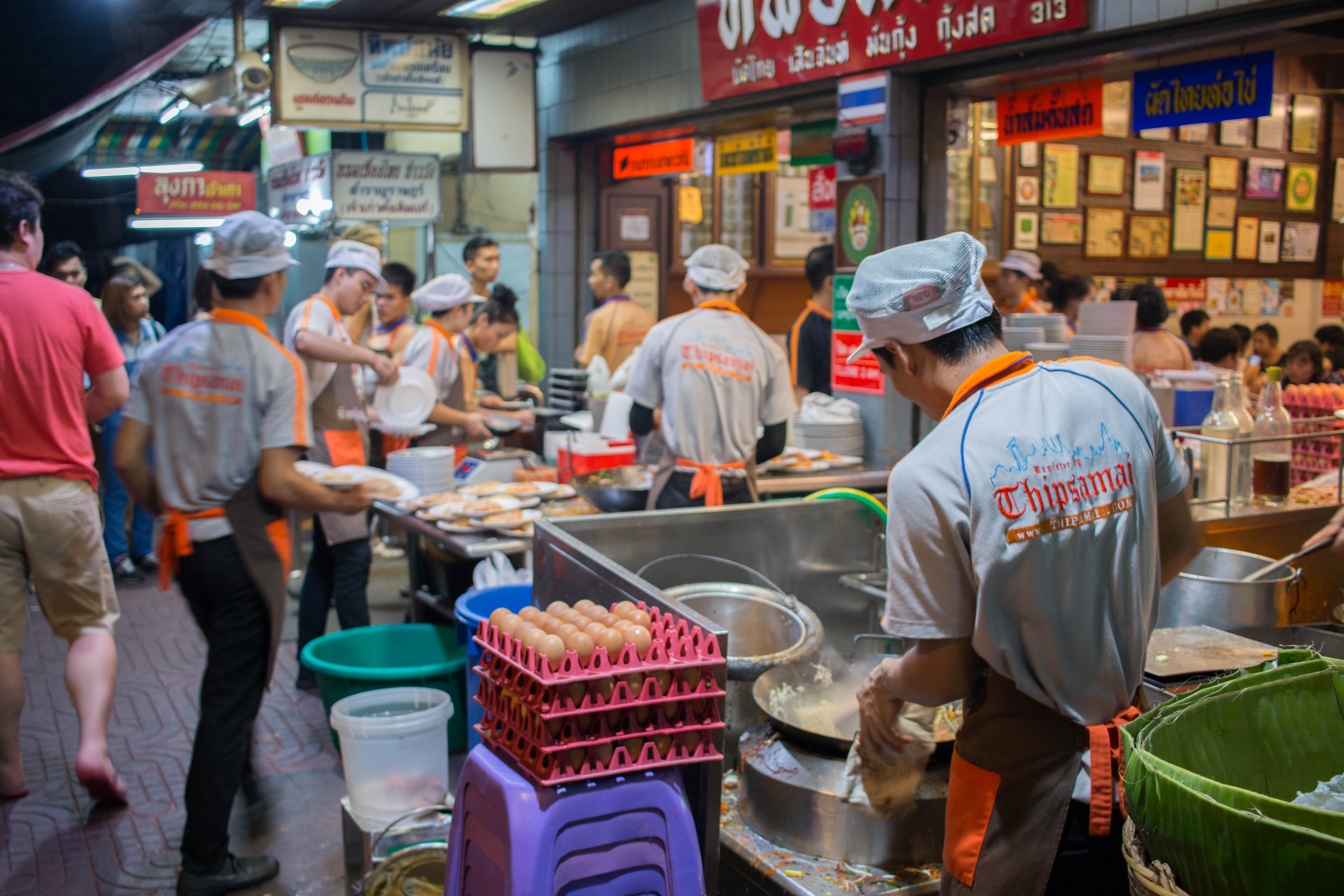
- The storefront in 2016
- Interactive map of Thipsamai ทิพย์สมัย

Restaurant information
- Established: 1966
- Owner: Sikarachat Baisamut
- Previous owner(s): Chote and Samai Baisamut
- Food type: Pad Thai; pork satay; fresh orange juice
- Website: thipsamai.com

Thipsamai (Thai: ทิพย์สมัย, pronounced [/tʰíp sà.máj]) is a restaurant on Maha Chai Road in Samran Rat, Bangkok, Thailand. The restaurant is notable for its Pad Thai, using sun dried sen chan noodles from Chantaburi Province and a homemade prawn oil.

== History ==
It opened in the 1950s as a street stall and subsequently moved into a physical storefront in 1966. Owned by Sikarachat Baisamut, Thipsamai was named for his mother, Samai Baisamut, who opened the stall in Bangkok after selling pad thai with her mother on a boat on Phasi Charoen Canal in Samut Sakhon Province.

According to the restaurant's history, after selling from a boat along the Phasi Charoen Canal, Samai married her husband, Chote Baisamut. Later, Chote's fishing business did not do well, so the couple decided to move to Bangkok with the hope of opening a restaurant. They walked all the way to Samran Rat, commonly known as Pratu Phi ("the Ghost Gate"), and started with a small street-side stall. According to accounts, Pratu Phi at that time was very quiet and dark, with almost no people around. It was not long before the stall became known through word of mouth, and the business gradually improved. Eventually, Field Marshal Plaek Phibunsongkhram, the Prime Minister at the time, visited and tried the Pad Thai. He reportedly said, "This Pad Thai at Pratu Phi is what Pad Thai is truly supposed to taste like." This helped the stall gain widespread recognition as "Pad Thai Pratu Phi." As the business prospered, the couple later rented a shophouse and officially opened the restaurant in 1966. The business has since been passed down to the current generation of owners.

== Branches ==
As of 2026, Thipsamai has a total of four branches. In addition to the original location at Samran Rat, the other branches are located at Iconsiam, Siam Paragon, and Phutthamonthon Sai 4, opposite Phutthamonthon, in the Salaya area on the western outskirts of Bangkok.

== Controversy ==
Despite its fame, much of the legendary history surrounding Thipsamai has been described as a one-sided claim. The oft-repeated story that Field Marshal Plaek Phibunsongkhram promoted noodles during World War II, leading to the creation of Pad Thai, is considered by the historian Siripote Laomanacharoen to be more of an anecdotal claim than verified fact. He has noted that it is entirely possible the Field Marshal was not even familiar with the dish by that name. Meanwhile, another longtime vendor nearby, "Lung Pa" (ลุงภา, "Uncle Pa"), whose real name was Prapa, was a man aged 76 at the time of his interview. He explained, "We all knew each other. Opening next to us is normal, but that place only came recently." Lung Pa's restaurant originally sold Pad Thai for just 8 baht per plate when it opened in 1975. As of 2026, Lung Pa has passed away. His testimony suggests that many of the techniques and recipes were shared among neighboring vendors, rather than being the invention of a single restaurant.
