= Wat Thepthidaram =

Buddhist temple in Bangkok, Thailand

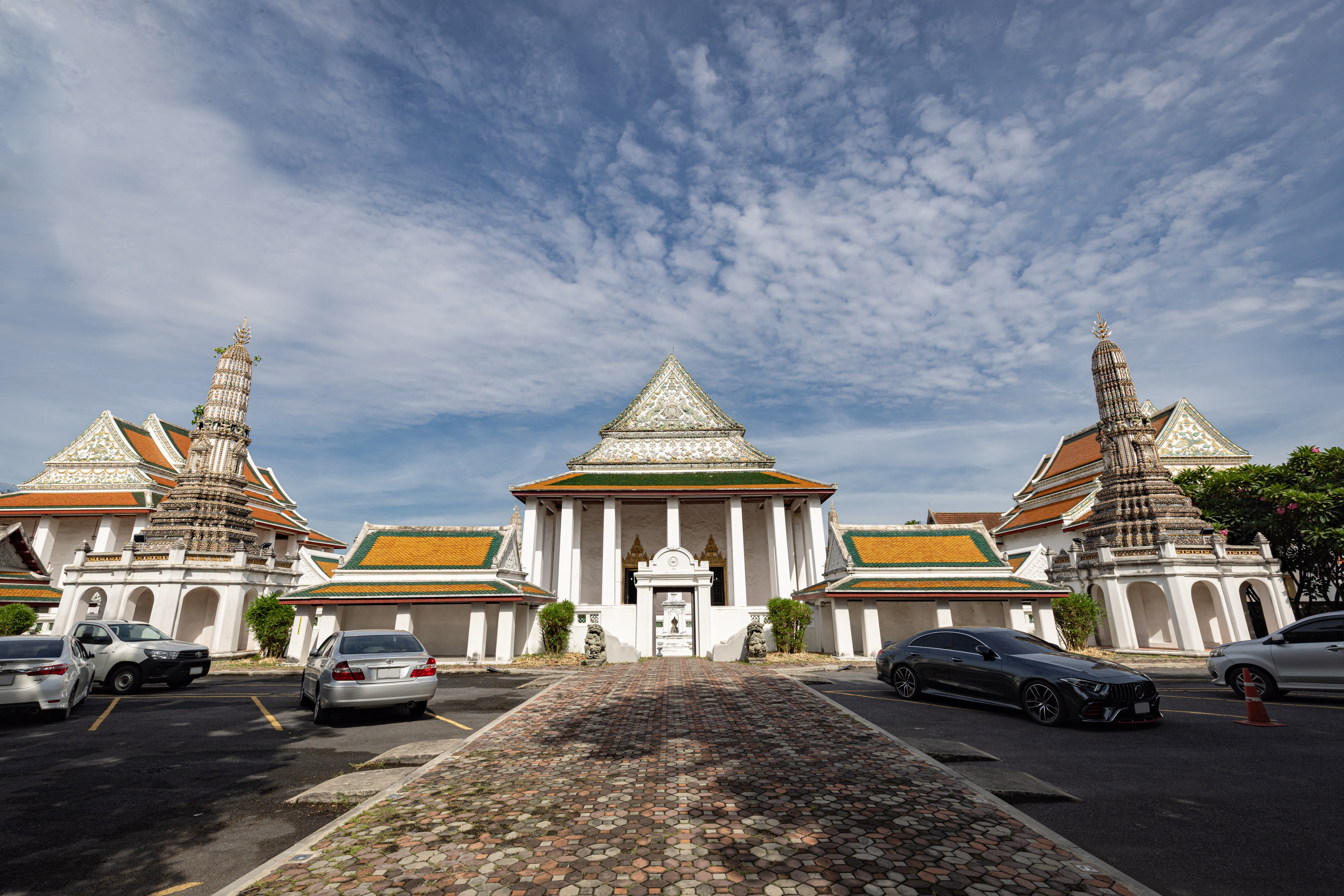
- Front façade of the temple

- Location within Bangkok

Religion
- Affiliation: Buddhism
- Sect: Theravāda
- Status: Third class royal monastery

Location
- Location: 70 Maha Chai Rd., Samran Rat, Phra Nakhon District, Bangkok
- Country: Thailand
- Interactive map of Wat Thepthidaram
- Coordinates: 13.753452°N 100.504219°E

Architecture
- Founder: King Rama III
- Completed: 1839

Wat Thepthidaram Worawihan or popularly known as Wat Thepthidaram is a third grade royal Buddhist temple in Worawihan type, located in the area known as Pratu Phi or official name Samran Rat, Bangkok, near Mahakan Fort and Wat Ratchanadda.

It is a historic temple, formerly name was Wat Phraya Krai Suan Luang, as it was located in Tambon Suan Luang Phraya Krai (assume that it should be a residence or a farm of a nobleman named Phraya Krai). King Nangklao (Rama III) founded the temple in the year 1836 in honour of his eldest daughter Princess Vilas, the Princess Apsorn Sudathep. The princess was a favourite of the king. The construction was completed in the year 1839, and a new royal name was bestowed as Wat Thepthidaram ("the temple of the celestial daughter"). Princess Vilas herself also contributed personally to the construction of the temple.

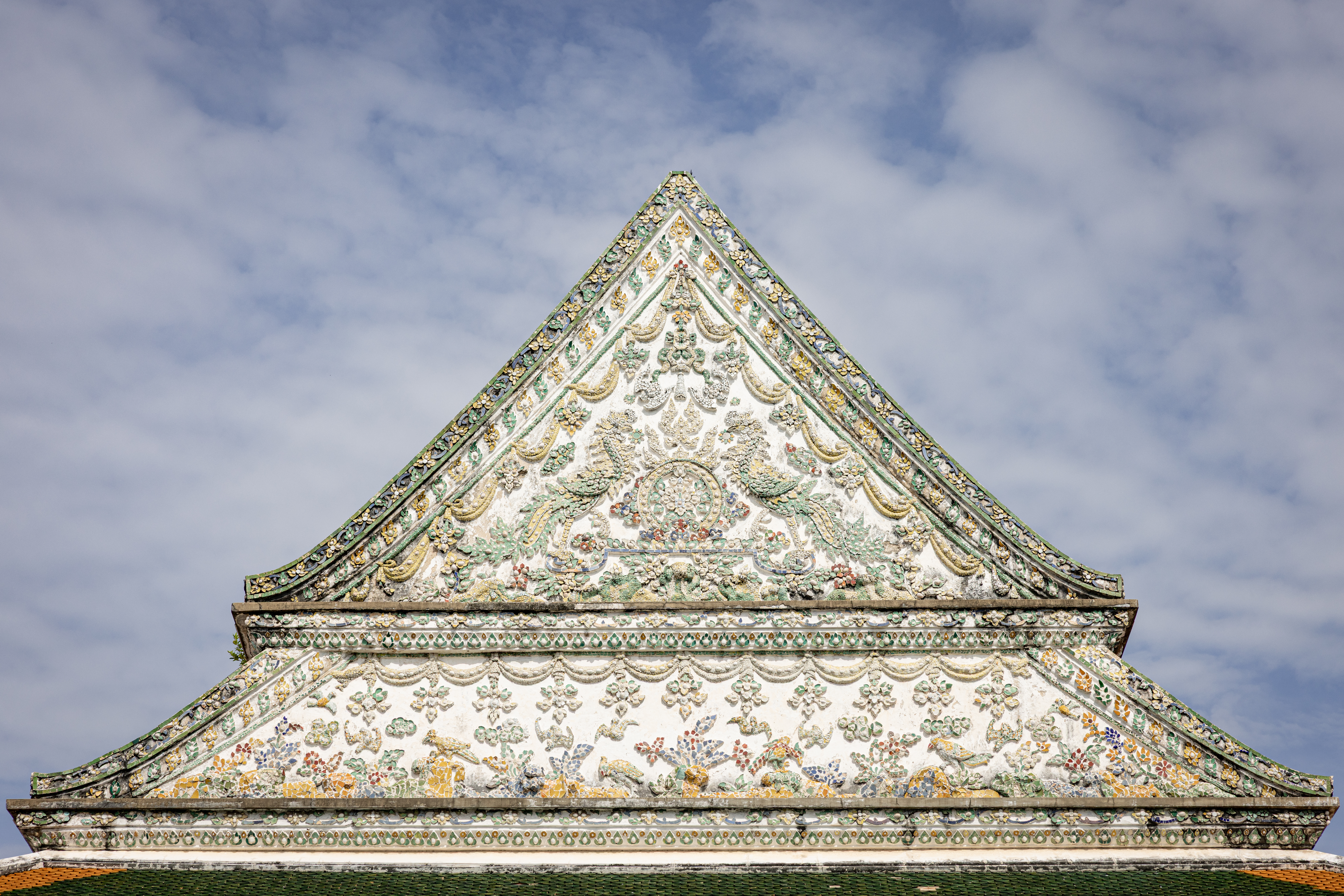
The gable of the ordination hall in Chinese architecture

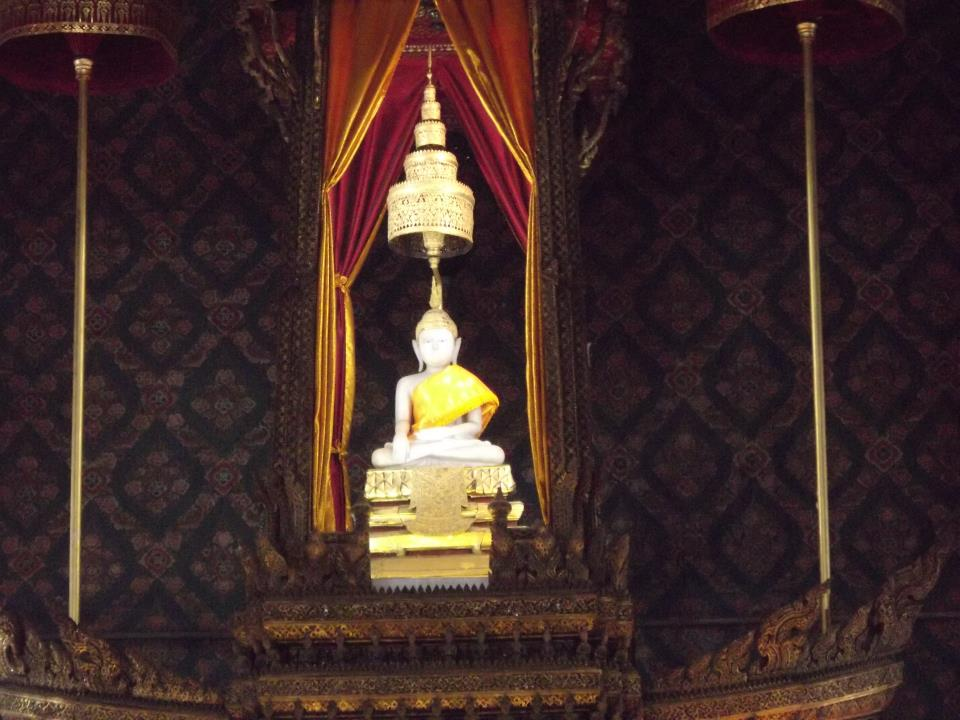
Principal Buddha Phra Phuttha Thewavilas

The temple has many items and artifacts with beautiful patterns, porcelain, and Chinese dolls, due to the prosperous of merchandising between China and Siam (Thailand in those days) as well as other historic temples, such as Wat Pho, Wat Suthat, Wat Ratcha Orasaram. In ordination hall, the principal Buddha image which was carved form pure white stone is enshrined inside the Wetchayan Butsabok (small size of mandapa), that King Rama III had invited from the Royal Grand Palace to the temple, hence, it got the name Luang Pho Khao (white reverend father).

Afterwards, King Bhumibol Adulyadej (Rama IX) gave the name Phra Phuttha Thewavilas to the Buddha image in the year 1971. The roof of the ordination hall had no Chofah Bai Raka (finals on the roof) and the gable was decorated with Chinese porcelain, similar to Wat Nang Chi or Wat Champa.

Another interesting attraction of this temple is there are 52 images of bhikkhunīs (female monk) in bhikkhunī sanctuary on the left side of the ordination hall. Which is different from general temples.

Wat Thepthidaram was registered to a national ancient monument by the Fine Arts Department in the year 1977.

Moreover, the temple was used to be the residence of Sunthorn Phu, the royal poet in the early Rattanakosin era, while he ordained as a monk (under patronage by Princess Vilas). This monk's dwelling is now open as the Sunthorn Phu Museum.

The waterway that runs through the side of the temple is named Khlong Lot Wat Thepthidaram, a part of Khlong Lot or Khlong Khu Mueang Doem, the old city moat around the Royal Grand Palace. It is the point where Khlong Lot splits into the old and current city moats separating into two canals. From its beginning in King Phutthayotfa Chulalok (Rama I)'s reign, the canal had no name. Later, in the occasion of 200th anniversary of Rattanakosin (Bangkok) in the year 1982, the government gave the two canal the official names as Khlong Lot Ratchanadda and Khlong Lot Wat Ratchabophit. Khlong Lot Wat Thepthidaram is a part of Khlong Lot Ratchanadda and also currents continuously to the side of Bangkok City Hall on Dinso Road side (in that part it is called Khlong Lot Wat Ratchanadda).
