= Benjamarachalai School =

- โรงเรียนเบญจมราชาลัย ในพระบรมราชูปถัมภ์

Location
- 126 Siriphong Road, Samran Rat, Phra Nakhon, Bangkok; 10200; Thailand; 13.7509605°N 100.4997298°E

Information
- Type: Public school
- Established: June 9, 1913; 113 years ago
- Founder: Prince Marubongsa Siribadhana
- School district: Office of the Basic Education Commission (OBEC)
- Director: Nongkran Banjerdteerakul
- Gender: Female
- Age range: 12–17
- Language: Thai; English; French; Chinese; Japanese
- Colors: Crimson and White
- Song: Benjamarachalai March
- Website: http://www.br.ac.th

The Benjamarachalai School is a schoolhouse situated in the old palace of the Prince Marubongsa Siribadhana, half-brother of King Rama V, in Bangkok, Thailand. He built the school in honor of King Rama V.

The school has since constructed four new buildings to replace the old, wooden one. It is currently a girls' school teaching students in grades 7-12. It offers art, science, math, and foreign language study. It is another all-girls secondary school in the Phra Nakhon district, alongside Satri Witthaya School and Rajini School.
