= Jay Fai =

Coordinates: 13°45′09″N 100°30′17″E

Raan Jay Fai
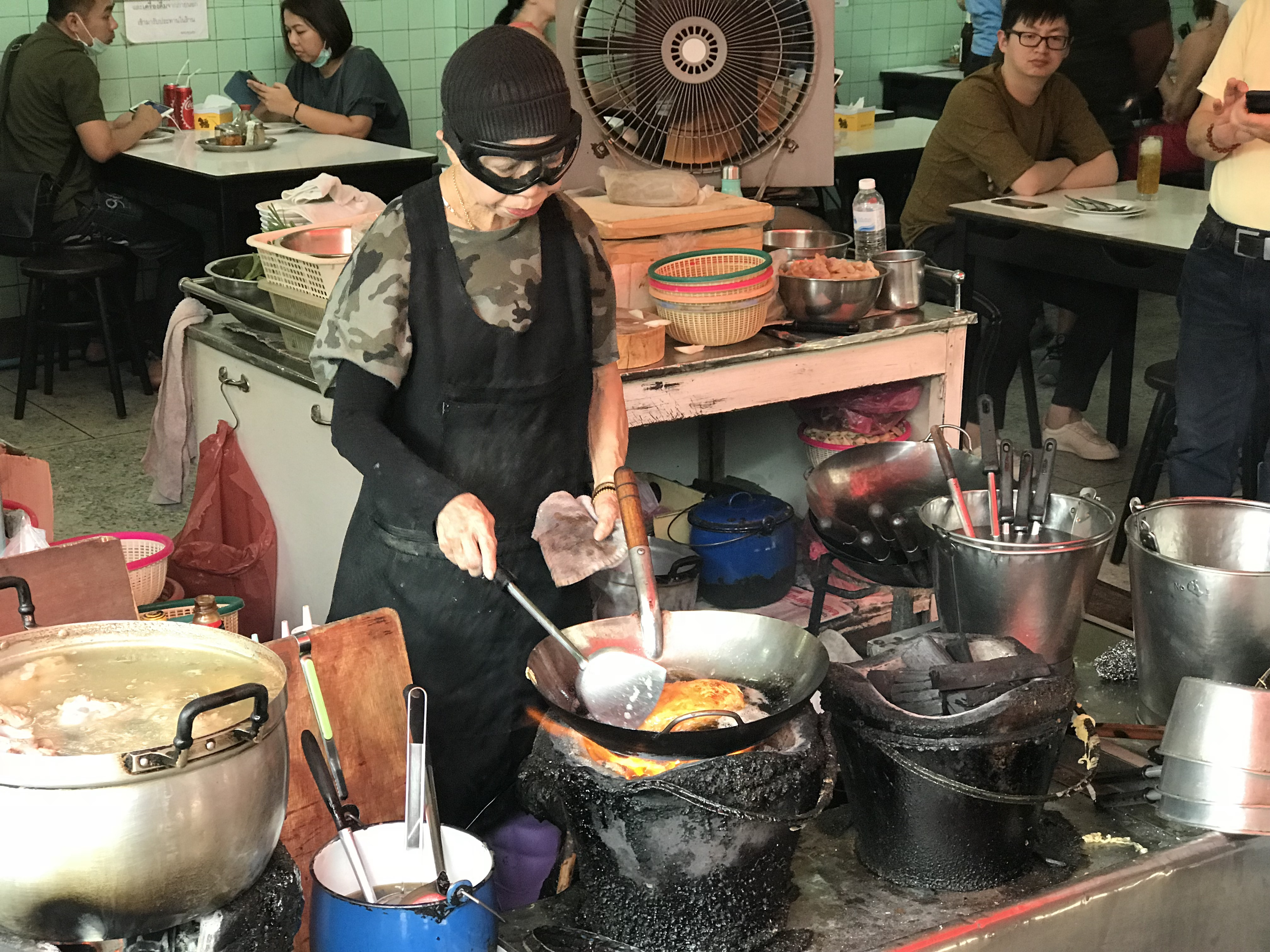
- Jay Fai cooking at the shop in 2018.
- Interactive map of Raan Jay Fai

Restaurant information
- Established: 1980s
- Owner: Jay Fai
- Head chef: Jay Fai
- Food type: Thai cuisine Street food
- Dress code: Casual
- Rating: (Michelin Guide)
- Location: 327 Mahachai Road, Bangkok, 10200, Thailand

Jay Fai (Thai: เจ๊ไฝ, (Note: RTGS: Che Fai, pronounced [t͡ɕéː fǎj]) also known as Raan Jay Fai (Note: ร้านเจ๊ไฝ, RTGS: Ran Che Fai, [ráːn t͡ɕéː fǎj]) 'Jay Fai's shop') is a street-side restaurant in Bangkok and a nickname of its eponymous owner, whose real name is Supinya Junsuta (สุภิญญา จันสุตะ). (Note: Jay Fai translates as "Sister Mole", a reference to her appearance.) The restaurant mainly serves wok-cooked seafood dishes, and is highly popular among food enthusiasts despite its high prices. It received one star in the inaugural Bangkok 2018 Michelin Guide.

== History ==
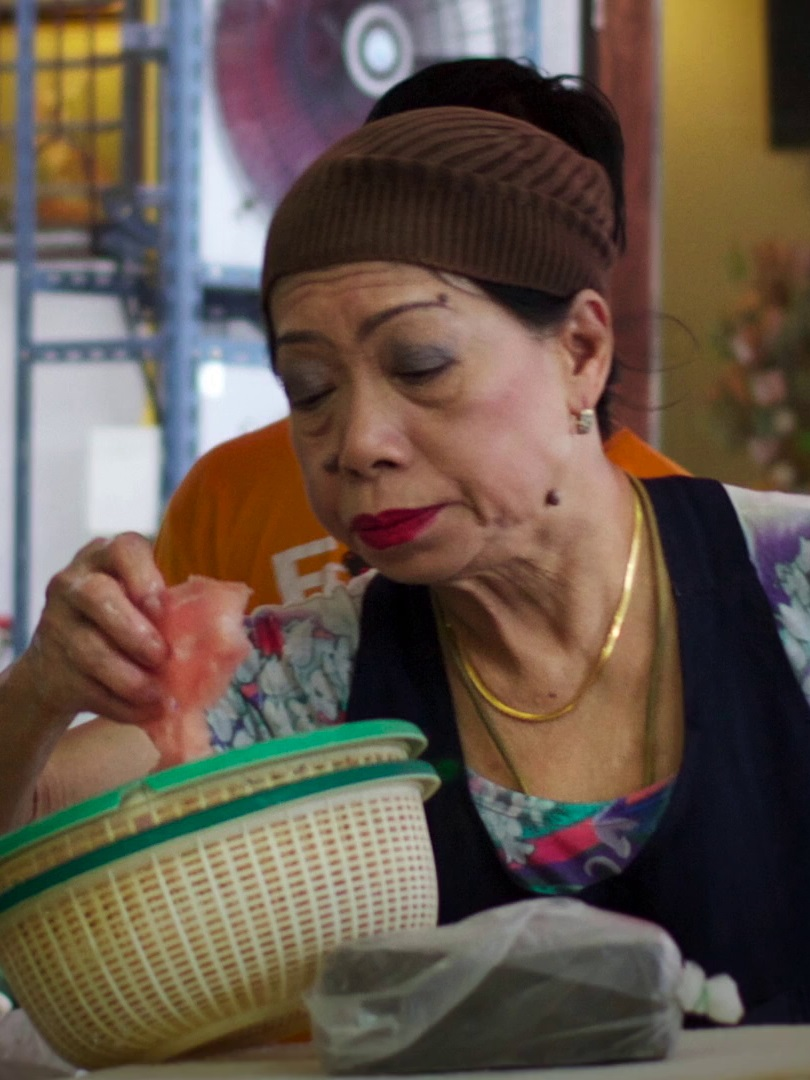
Jay Fai in 2013

Jay Fai was born c. 1945 to Chinese immigrant parents, who sold kuaitiao khua kai (chicken noodles) for a living. However, she was not good at cooking, and had to learn from her younger sister, who originally doubted her abilities. Jay Fai did not initially join the family business; instead, she worked as a seamstress for several years, until a fire prompted her to turn to cooking when she was in her thirties. (Note: Some sources state that the business destroyed by the fire was her own, others that she was an employee. Yet others say that it was her home that was burned down.) She opened her restaurant in the 1980s and originally served congee and noodle dishes such as kuaitiao khua kai and rat na, building on her mother's recipes. She then gradually expanded her repertoire, experimenting and developing her own recipes and techniques. She also began using seafood, travelling extensively to procure better ingredients and charging accordingly. The restaurant gained a steady stream of followers, and has since become one of the most famous street-side restaurants in the city.

== Operations ==
Jay Fai's restaurant occupies a shophouse on Maha Chai Road, in the neighbourhood known as Samran Rat or Pratu Phi in Bangkok's Phra Nakhon District. It is open-air and sparsely decorated, with green tiled walls and simple tables and stools for seating. Cooking takes place at the side of the shop, where the walls open onto a small alley, using two charcoal braziers. Jay Fai herself works as the restaurant's sole chef, wearing ski goggles while she cooks.

Jay Fai procures ingredients, especially seafood, directly from several sources, placing an emphasis on quality. This is reflected in her prices, which are much higher than regular street fare. One of her more famous dishes, for example, is a crab-meat omelette which costs upwards of 1,000 baht (over US$30). Other popular dishes include rat na and phat khi mao with seafood.

== Reception ==
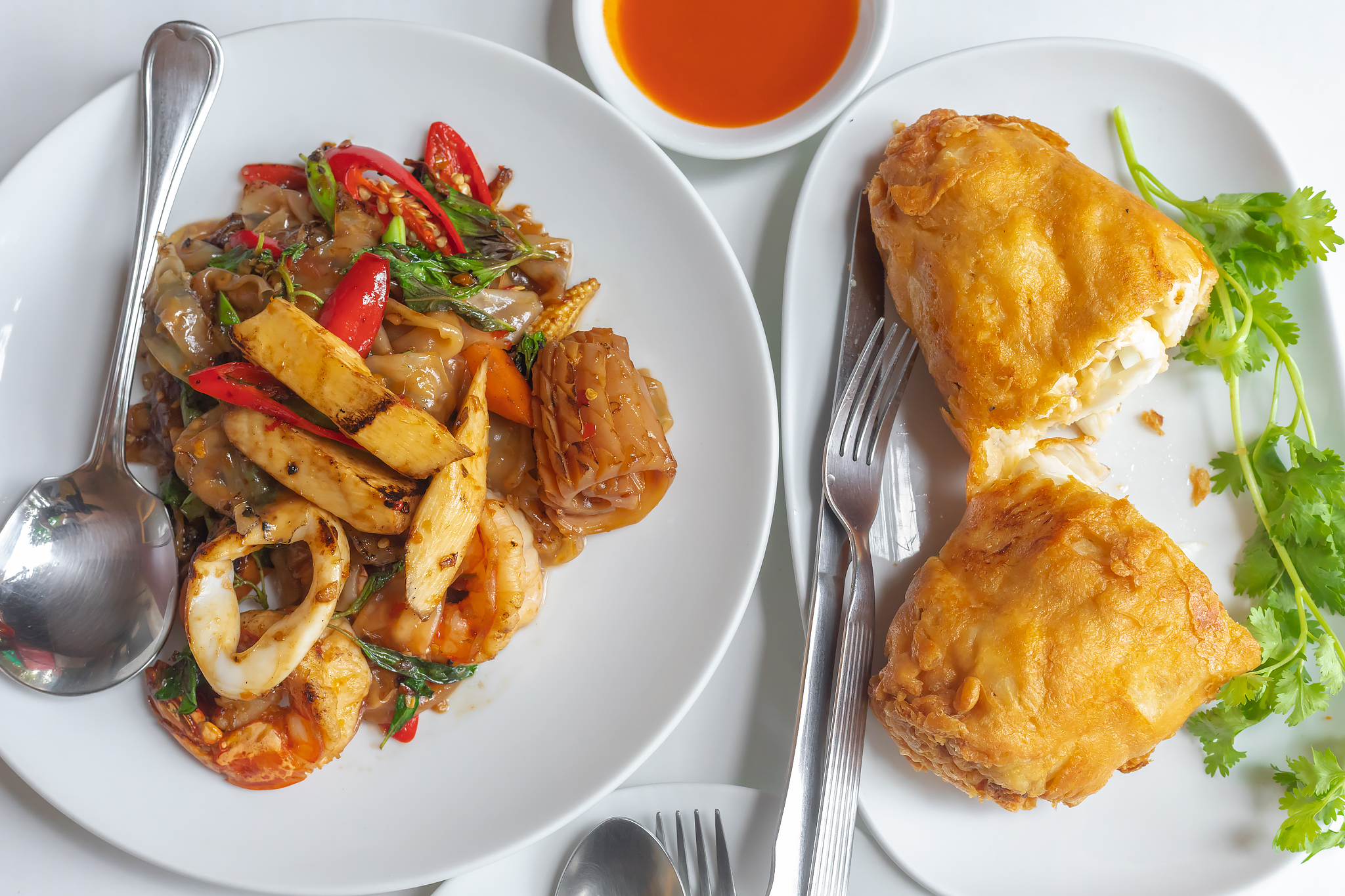
Jay Fai's most famous dishes - crab omelette and drunken noodles.

The restaurant has been famous among food enthusiasts for decades. In a 1999 review, Bangkok Post food critic Ung-aang Talay (Bob Halliday) described her as "one of those increasingly rare Mozarts of the noodle pan who can transform very ordinary, lunchtime-at-the-market dishes into masterpieces of local cuisine". Famous customers include Martha Stewart, who called Jay Fai "the best cook in Thailand".

In December 2017, the Michelin Guide released its inaugural 2018 edition for Bangkok, in which the restaurant was awarded one star. It was the only street restaurant to be awarded a star, and joins a handful of others in Hong Kong and Singapore as a result of Michelin's efforts to diversify its coverage, previously limited to fine dining establishments. The award resulted in a surge of customers for Jay Fai, who had never heard of the guide before and had to be persuaded to attend the ceremony. Following the announcement, the restaurant became so busy that it had to implement a reservations system (something she previously refused to do), and one of Jay Fai's daughters had to leave her job in order to help full-time (in addition to another, who already worked at the restaurant). In 2021, Jay Fai also won the Asia's 50 Best Restaurants Icon Award.

Jay Fai, who has never written down a recipe, has said that she does not intend to pass on the business, as she does not wish her children to pick up the hard work since it has earned enough. In 2024, she denied plans to retire and close the restaurant the following year.

Jay Fai was featured on the Netflix TV series, Street Food, in the Bangkok, Thailand episode. Many of her famous dishes were introduced, such as tom yum soup, dry tom yum, and crab meat omelette.

== Criticism ==
In August 2025, a post circulated on social media by a food influencer claiming to have tried the crab omelette at Jay Fai's restaurant, priced at 1,500 baht per plate. However, the bill came out to 4,000 baht. This incident sparked widespread criticism and further controversy, with some posts even claiming that a simple stir-fried vegetable dish was priced at 600 baht, which was considered excessively overpriced.

Ultimately, the Office of The Consumer Protection Board (OCPB), together with the Department of Internal Trade (DIT) under the Ministry of Commerce, conducted an on-site inspection and fined the restaurant 2,000 baht. They also instructed the restaurant to display clear pricing. Regarding the matter, the restaurant explained that the famous crab omelette has two prices: 1,500 baht and 4,000 baht, the latter being a special price for VIP customers.

== See also ==
- List of Thai restaurants
