= Wat Saket =

Buddhist temple in Bangkok, Thailand

Wat Saket Ratchawora Mahawihan
- วัดสระเกศราชวรมหาวิหาร (วัดสระเกศ)
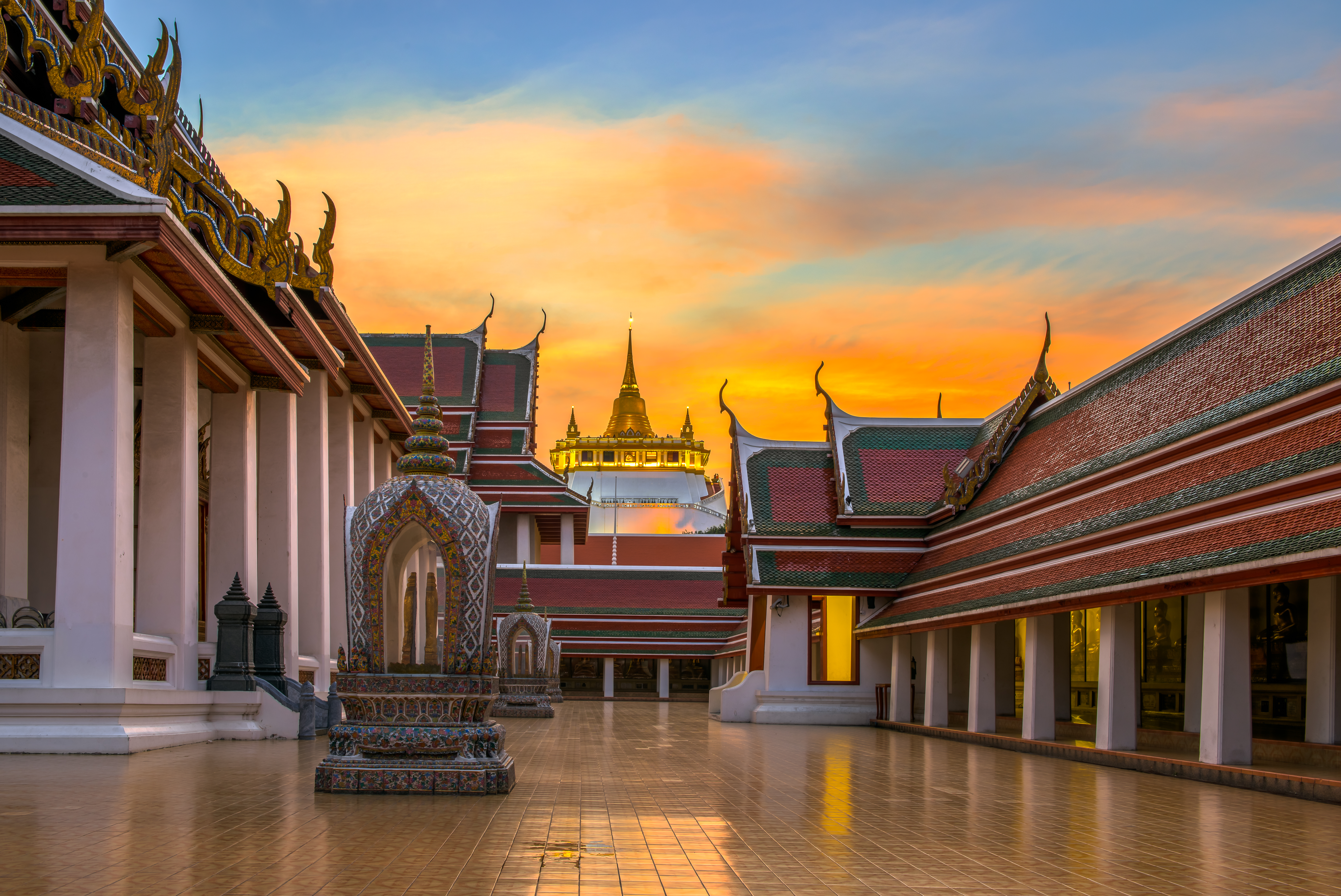
- The courtyard of Wat Saket, with the Golden Mount visible in the background.

- Location within Bangkok

Religion
- Affiliation: Theravada Buddhism

Location
- Location: Boripat Road, Khwaeng Ban Bat, Khet Pom Prap Sattru Phai, Bangkok 10100
- Country: Thailand
- Coordinates: 13°45′14″N 100°30′30″E

Architecture
- Type: Thai Architecture
- Completed: Unknown (believed to be Ayutthaya period; renovated many times during the Rattanakosin period)

Website
- www.facebook.com/watsraket

Wat Saket Ratchawora Mahawihan (Thai: วัดสระเกศราชวรมหาวิหาร), commonly known as Wat Saket, is a Buddhist temple (wat) in the Pom Prap Sattru Phai district of Bangkok, Thailand.

The temple dates back to the Ayutthaya period, when it was known as Wat Sakae (วัดสะแก). When Bangkok became the capital, King Rama I (1737–1809) renovated the temple and bestowed its present name (literally meaning "to wash the hair"). According to tradition, the king stopped here to bathe and wash his hair upon returning from war, before entering the inner city.

== Phu Khao Thong ==
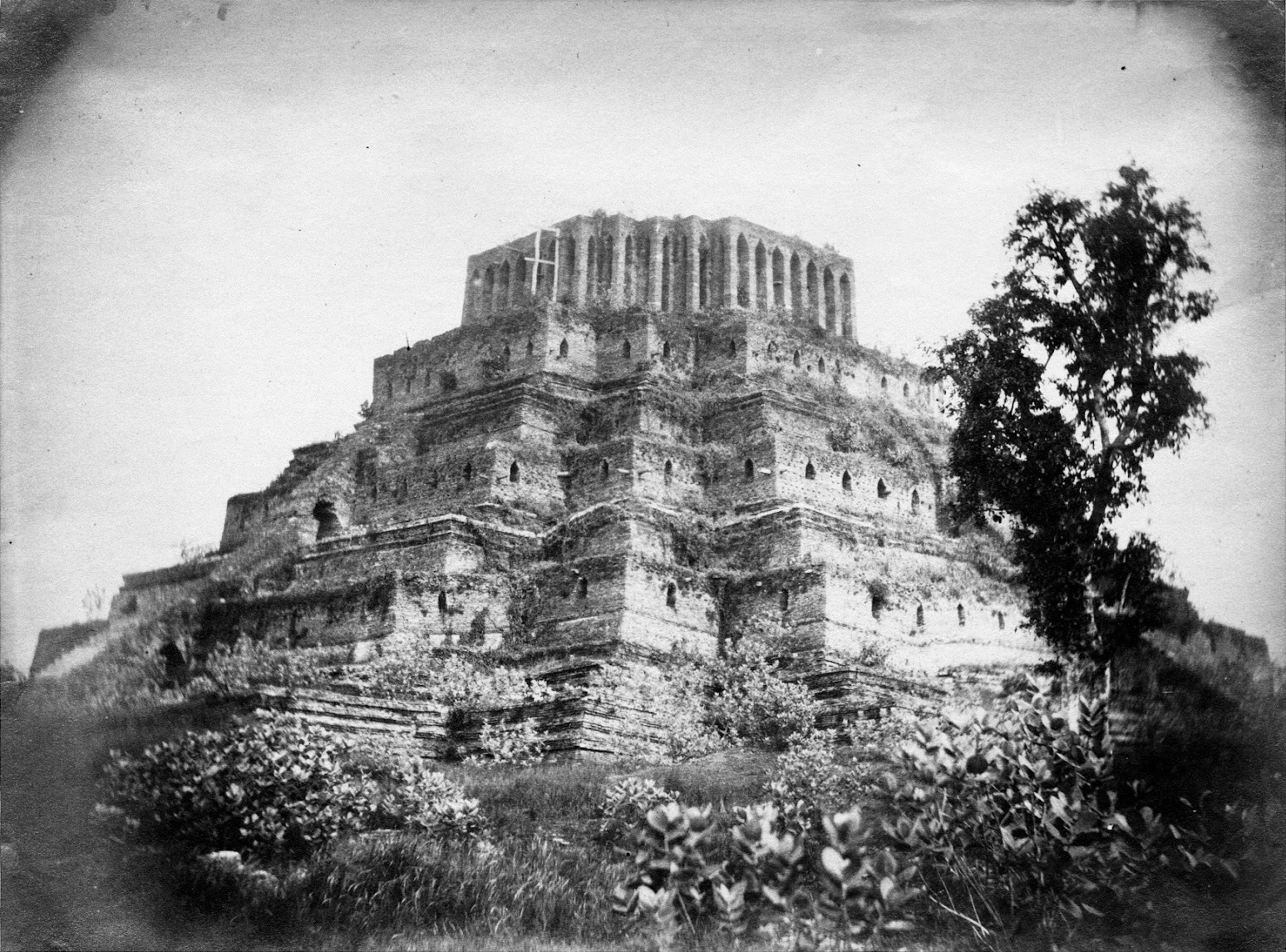
Chedi inside Wat Saket before it collapsed

Phu Khao Thong (“Golden Mountain”, ภูเขาทอง) is a steep artificial hill inside the Wat Saket compound.

Rama I's grandson, King Rama III (1788–1851), decided to build a chedi of huge dimensions inside Wat Saket, but the chedi collapsed during construction because the soft soil of Bangkok could not support the weight. Over the next few decades, the abandoned mud-and-brick structure acquired the shape of a natural hill and was overgrown with weeds. The locals called it the phu khao (ภูเขา, 'mountain'), as if it was a natural feature. During that time, it also functioned as a lookout tower for soldiers concerned about the arrival of enemy armies.

During the reign of King Rama IV, construction began of a small chedi on the hill. It was completed early in the reign of his son, King Rama V (1853–1910) and sanctified by being covered in a layer of gold. A relic of the Buddha was brought from Sri Lanka by Prince Pritsadang and placed in the chedi. The surrounding concrete walls were added in the 1940s to stop the hill from eroding. The modern Wat Saket was built in the early 20th century using Carrara marble.

An annual festival is held at Wat Saket every November, featuring a candlelight procession up Phu Khao Thong to the chedi, which is wrapped in a long red robe—just like the "Hae Pha Khuen That" (แห่ผ้าขึ้นธาตุ) festival at Wat Phra Mahathat in Nakhon Si Thammarat province, southern Thailand. Devotees write their names and their family member's names on the robe and pray, believing that their wishes will be fulfilled. This tradition has been observed since the reign of King Rama V.

At the same time, a grand Loi Krathong festival takes place at the temple, accompanied by sideshows and freak exhibits such as Phi Krasue (ผีกระสือ; "a floating female ghost head with glowing entrails"), Dek Song Hua (เด็กสองหัว, "a two-headed child"), Mia Ngu (เมียงู, "the snake's wife"), or fun games like Sao Noi Tok Nam (สาวน้อยตกน้ำ, "the little girl falls into the water"), among others. The festival is well known among Bangkok residents. The nearby Fort Mahakan community was once a hub of the fireworks industry, but following the demolition of the fort and relocation of the community, the trading of fireworks has been banned.

Phu Khao Thong is now a popular Bangkok tourist attraction and has become a symbol of the city.

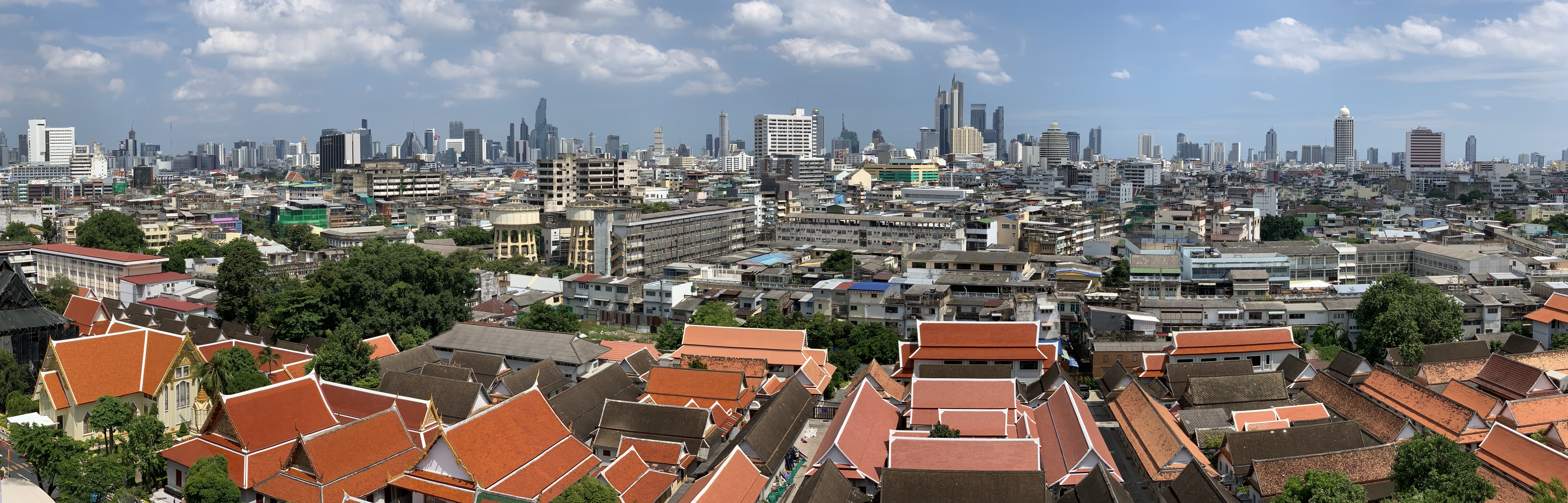
Panoramic view from the Golden Mountain

== Vultures of Wat Saket ==
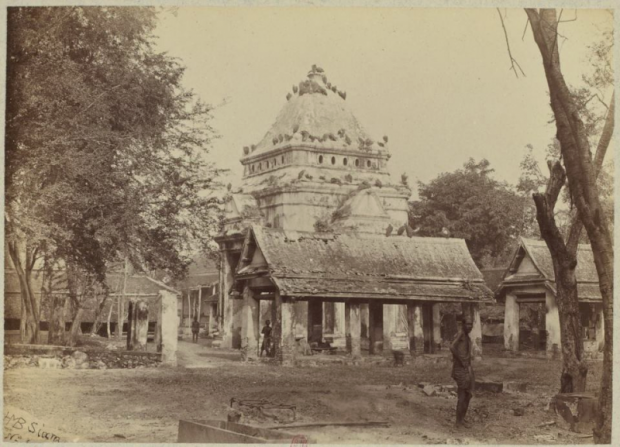
Cement crematorium near Wat Saket in the past (circa 1900); the black spots atop the crematorium are vultures waiting to eat the corpses. The crematorium was demolished to make way for the Men Pun intersection at the end of the Sommot Amon Mak bridge

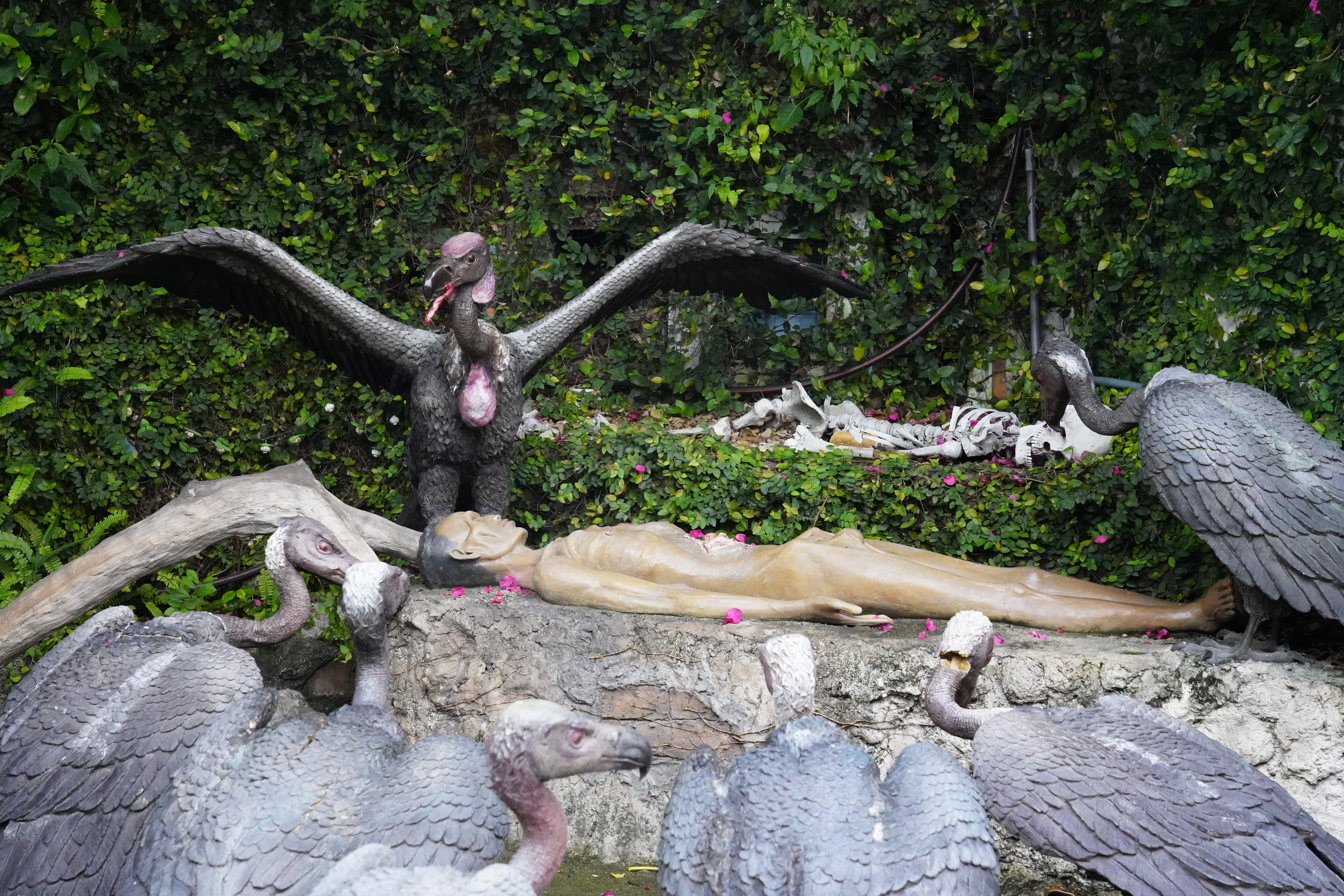
The vulture statues in memory of the cholera outbreaks, when the vultures ate the corpses

In the early Rattanakosin period (between the reigns of Rama I and Rama V), the Siamese had a tradition of avoiding cremations within the city walls, believing them to be inauspicious. Wat Saket, located outside the fortified area, thus became a frequent site for funerals. Corpses were carried through the Pratu Phi, or 'ghost gate', to be cremated there.

In 1820, during the reign of King Rama II (1809–1824), a cholera outbreak spread from Penang to Bangkok, claiming over 30,000 lives in the capital. Wat Saket became the city's main receiving ground for the dead, alongside Wat Sangwet in Banglamphu and Wat Choeng Lane in Sampheng. The sheer number of bodies overwhelmed the cremation facilities. Many corpses were left exposed in the monastery's open areas, attracting flocks of vultures that came to feed. Wat Saket effectively became a feeding ground for carrion birds. Cholera outbreaks recurred each dry season until the early reign of King Rama V. The most severe epidemic occurred in 1840 during King Rama III's reign, when one in ten people in Siam and its surroundings perished. The final major outbreak came in 1881, with hundreds dying each day.

The image of vultures circling above Wat Saket became a haunting symbol of death. The phrase Raeng Wat Saket (แร้งวัดสระเกศ, "vultures of Wat Saket") entered popular speech, often paired with Pret Wat Suthat (เปรตวัดสุทัศน์, "preta of Wat Suthat")—a likely reference to ghostly legends surrounding the temple's murals.

== Gallery ==
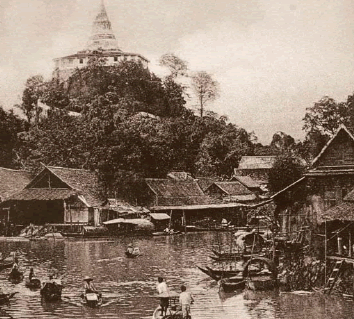
Historic photo of Wat Saket and Golden Mount during King Rama V's reign

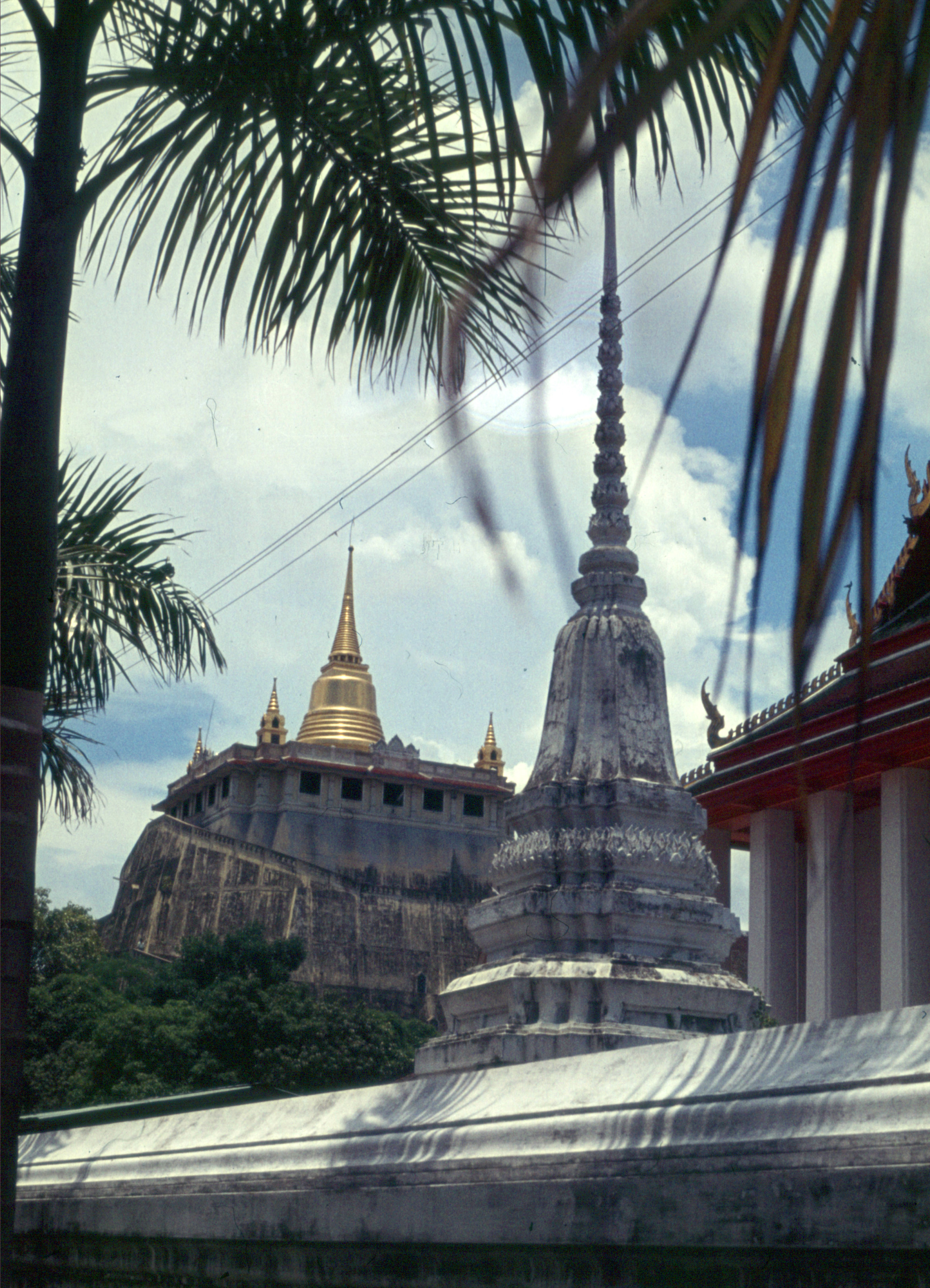
The Golden Mount in 1976

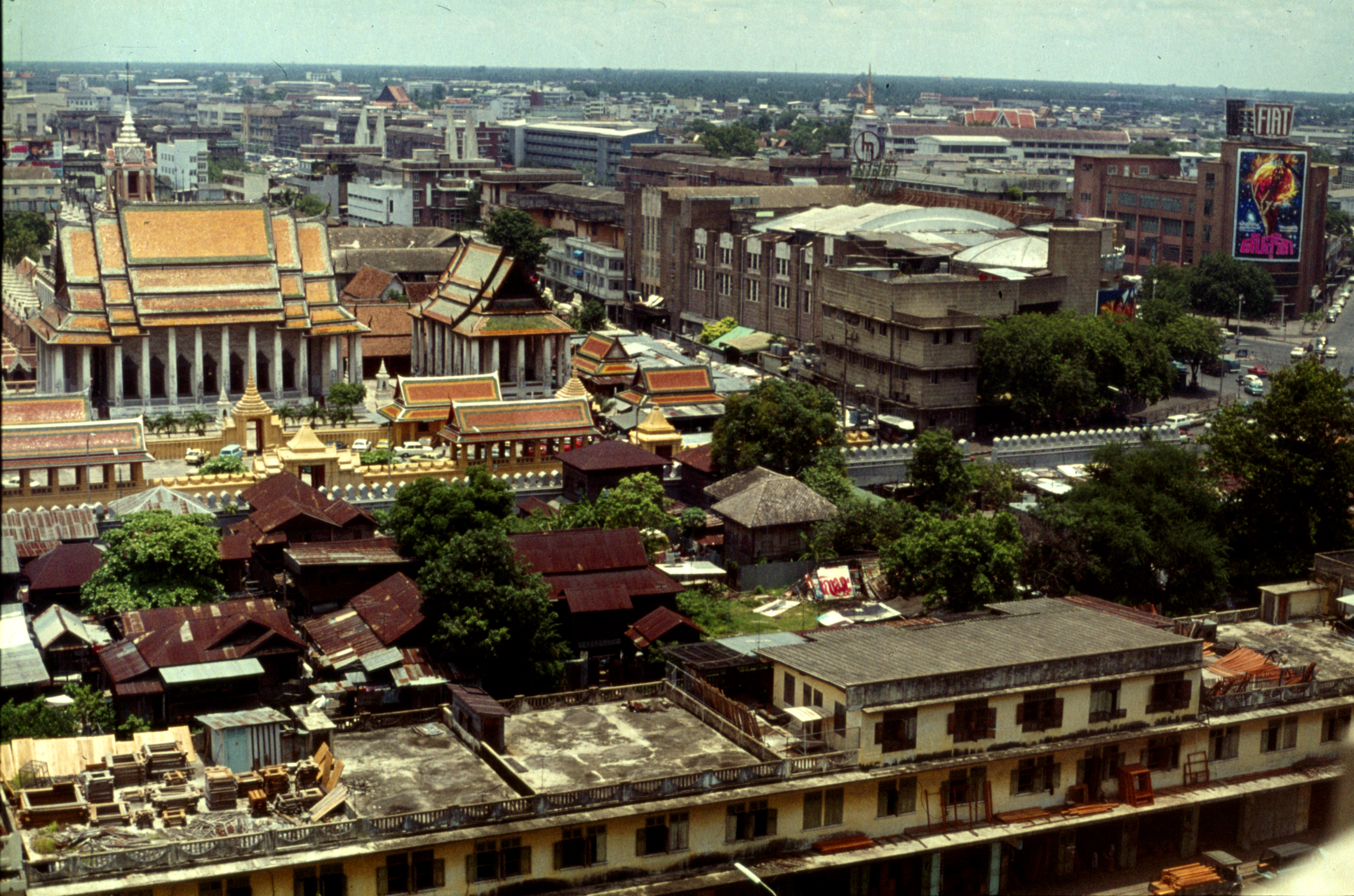
Wat Saket in 1976

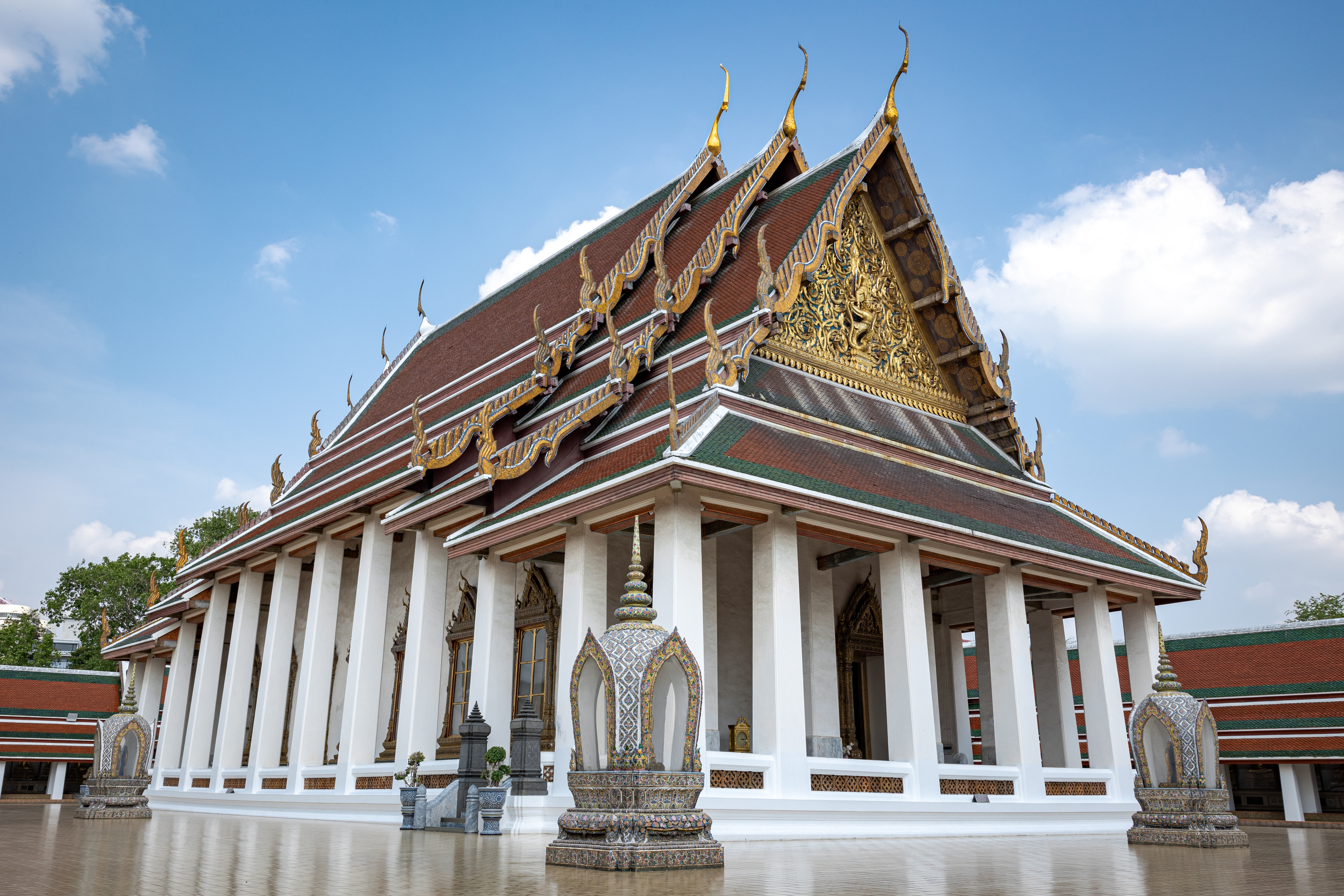
The main Ordination hall (ubosot)

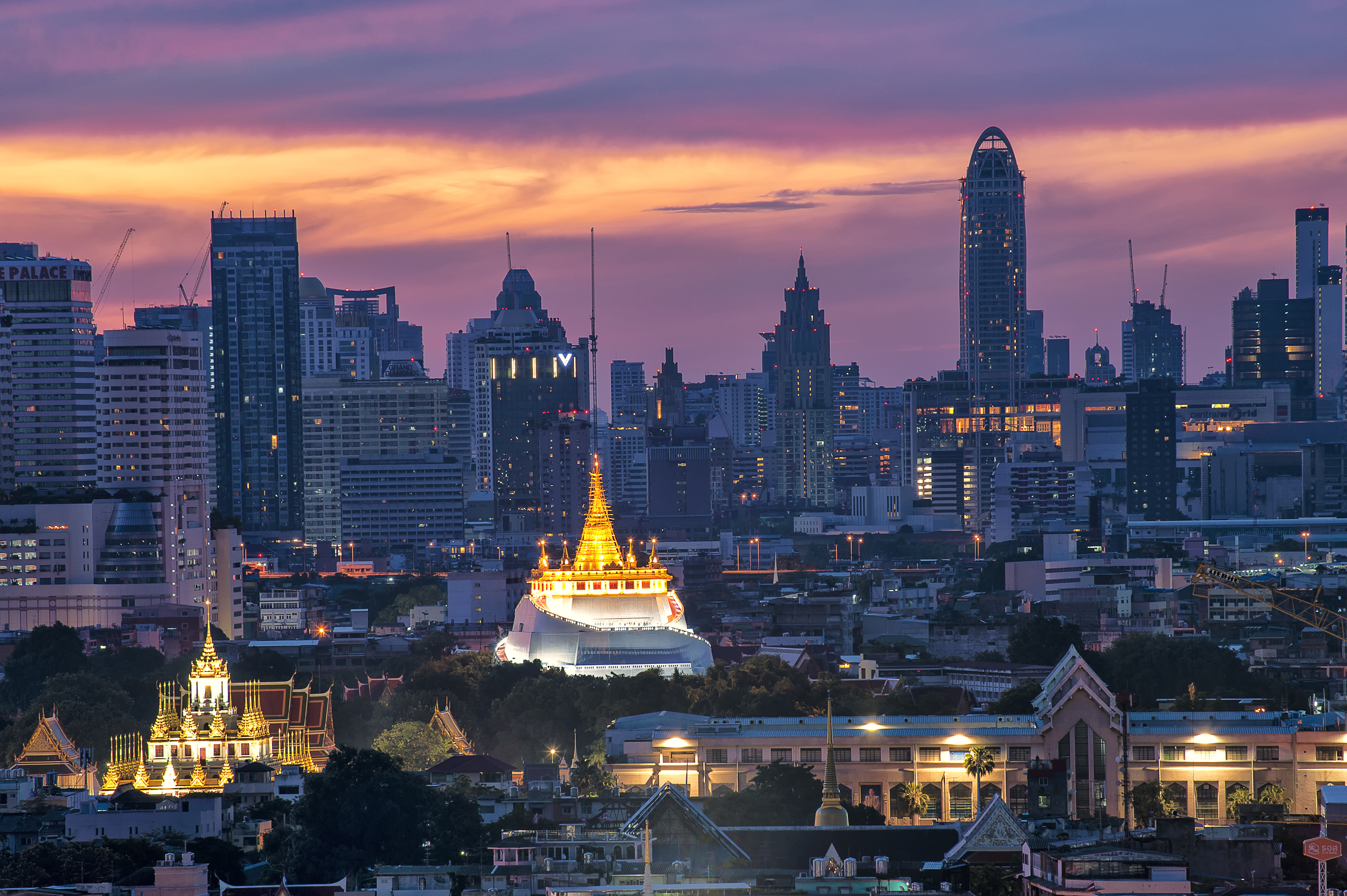
Wat Saket and Wat Ratchanatdaram

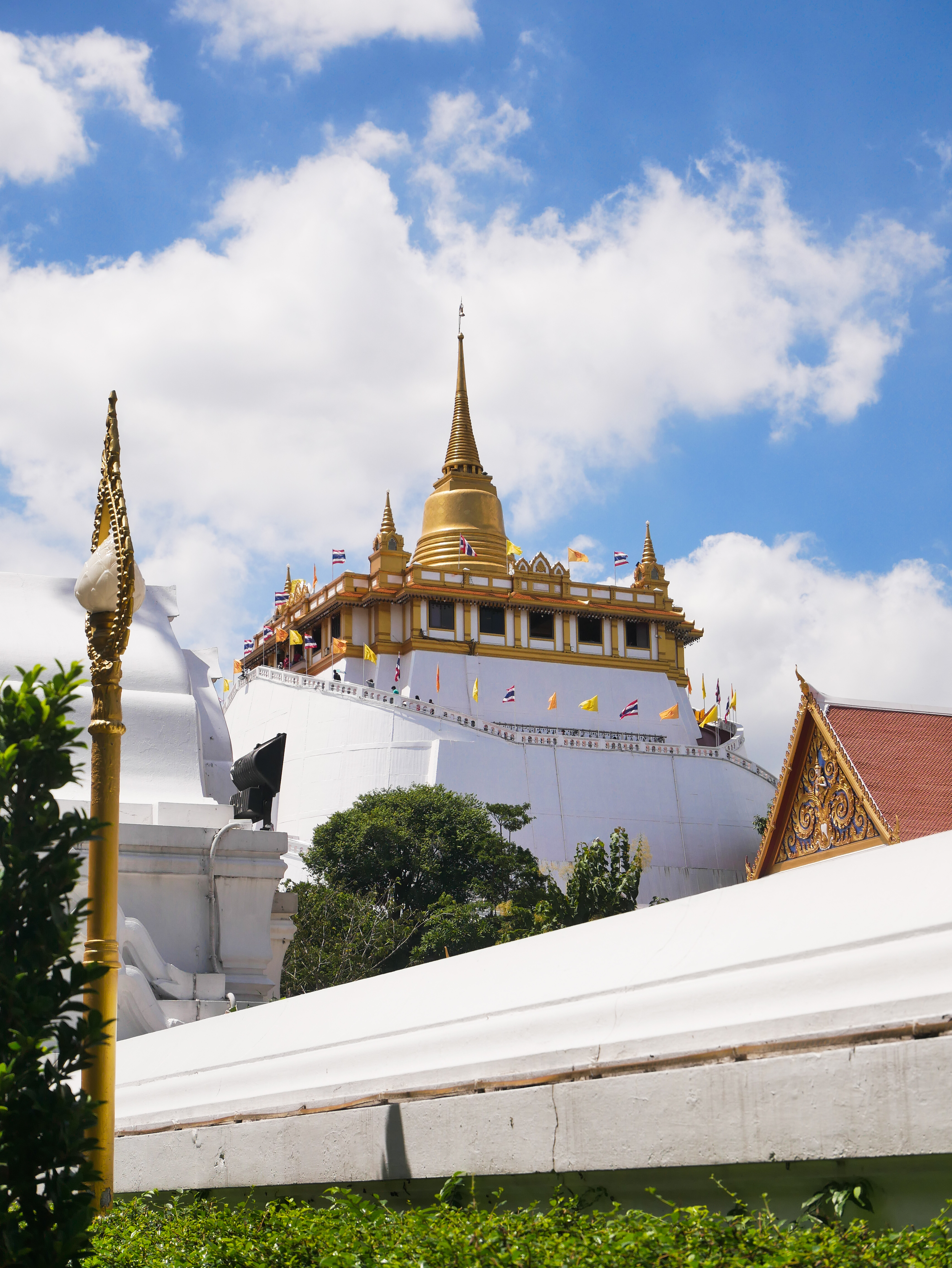
The Golden Mount in 2022

== See also ==
- History of Bangkok
- Sumeru
- Mandala (Southeast Asian history)
- Wat Si Saket

== Sources ==
- Norwich, John Julius (2001), Great architecture of the world, USA: Da Capo Press Inc., ISBN 0-306-81042-5
