= Bangkok Corrections Museum =

Prison museum in Thailand

Coordinates: 13.748488°N 100.503482°E

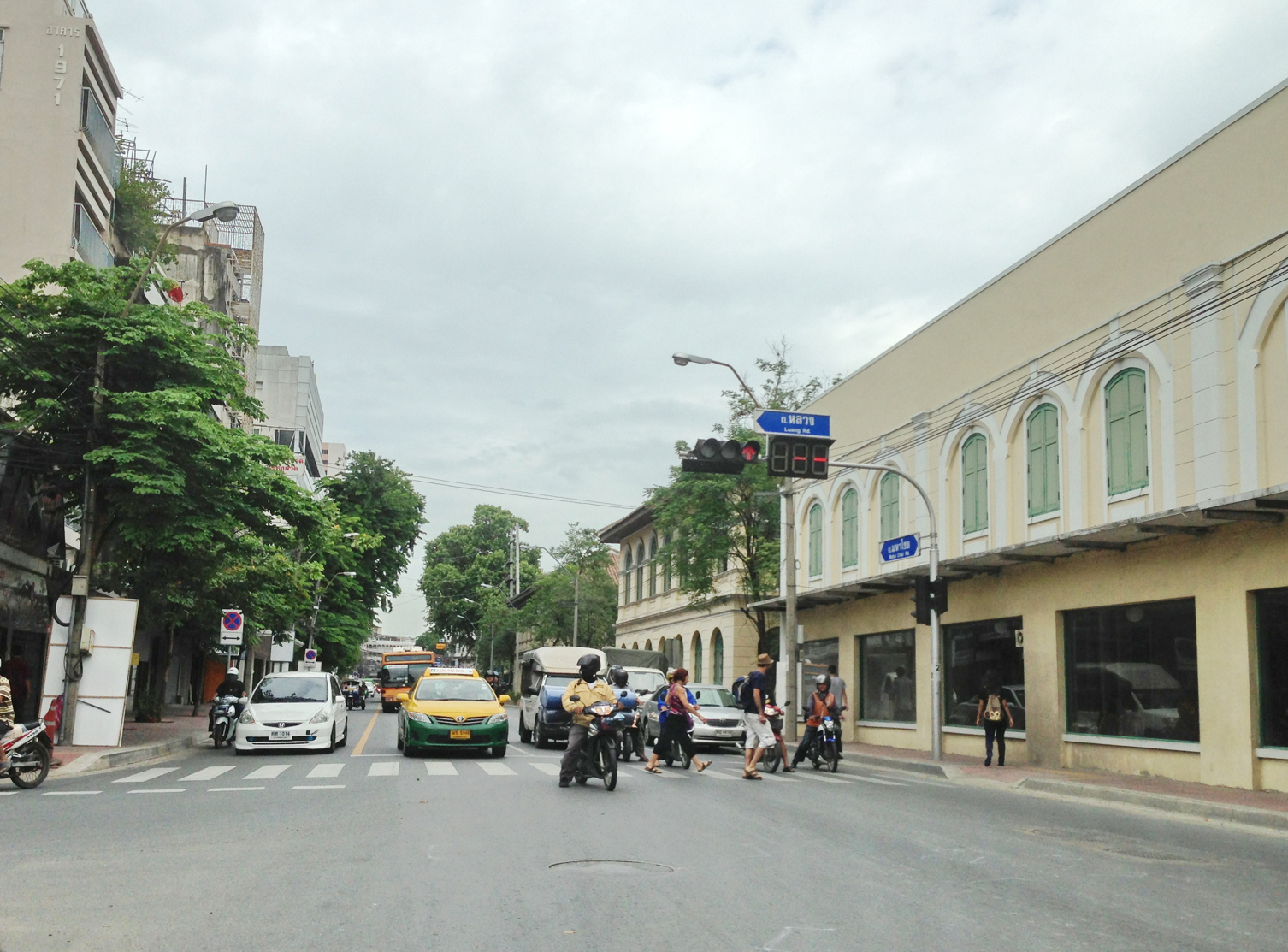
Correction Museum

The Bangkok Corrections Museum is an incarceration museum in Bangkok, Thailand. It is located on Maha Chai Road. It was modelled on the Brixton Prison of England. The prison museum was established in 1939 in another prison, the Bang Kwang Central Prison, which had served as a training center for corrections officers and gained the notorious title "Bangkok Hilton" in the way that the Hanoi Hilton did in Vietnam for its brutal prison history.

The museum records the macabre history and prison life in Thailand. Later the remainder of the site became the Rommaninat Park, officially opening on August 7, 1999, by Prince Maha Vajiralongkorn.

The museum is closed for the foreseeable future.

== Display ==
On the upper floor are life-sized waxed figures involved in execution scenes, depicting gruesome scenes with swords and torture.

The second and third blocks of the Bangkok Corrections Museum contrastingly exhibit the finest items made by the prison inmates during their imprisonment such as furniture and handicraft, some of which are for sale.

Cell Block 9 however, is considerably more brutal, exhibiting the execution chamber and quarters where they would eat their last meal. Numerous weapons used in the old penal system are on display, notably the man-sized rattan ball with sharp nails pointing inwards.
