= Pom Prap Sattru Phai district =

Pom Prap Sattru Phai ป้อมปราบศัตรูพ่าย
- Khet
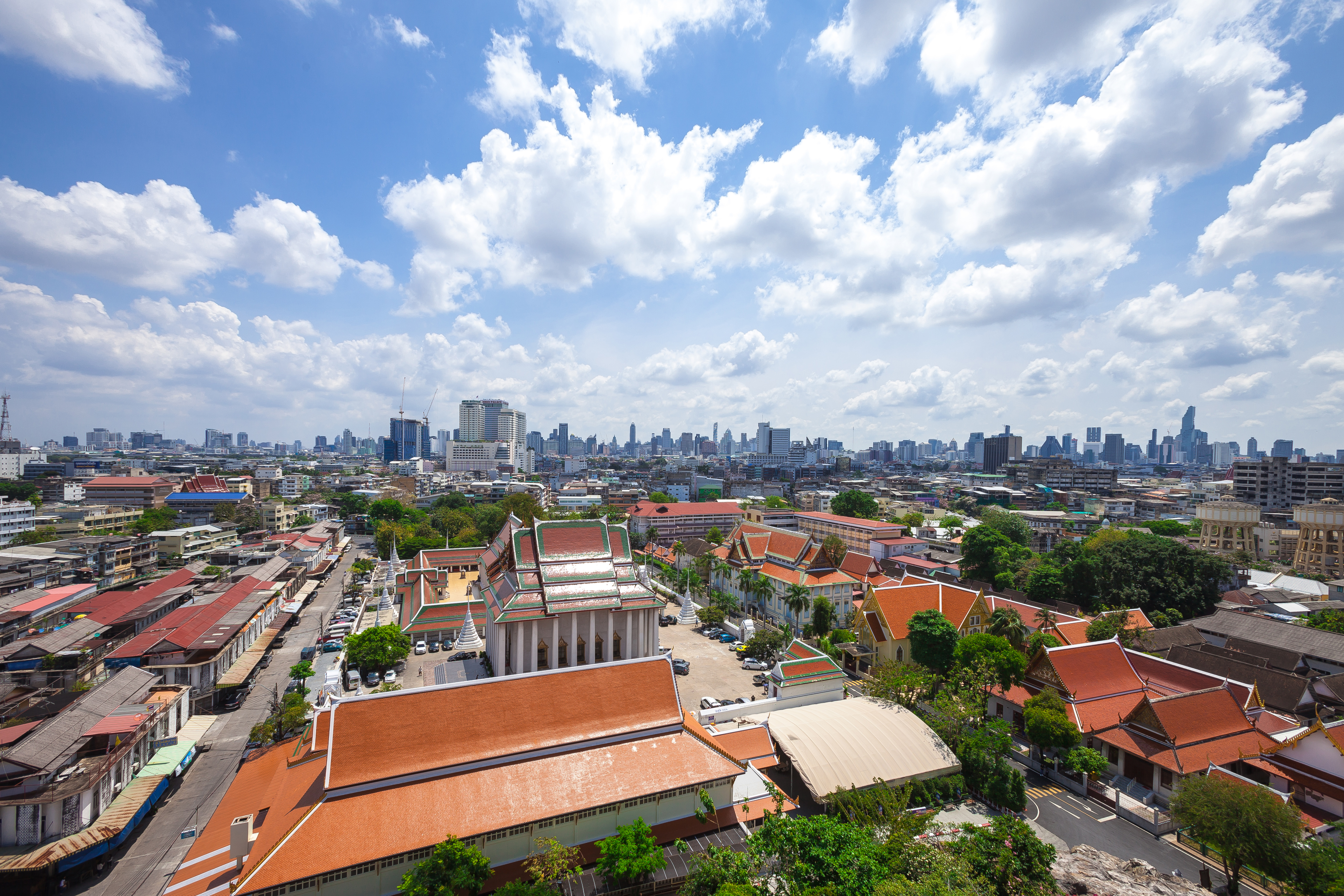
- Pom Prap Sattru Phai from Wat Saket
- Mottoes: The renowned business centre, the treasure of knowledge and the house of the elegant Golden Mount, the 22 July Circle, the religious Ban Bat community, the Muay Thai circus and several foundations
- District location in Bangkok
- Coordinates: 13°45′29″N 100°30′47″E
- Country: Thailand
- Province: Bangkok
- Seat: Wat Sommanat
- Khwaeng: 5

Area
  - Total: 1.931 km^{2} (0.746 sq mi)

Population (2017)
  - Total: 46,581
  - Density: 24,122.73/km^{2} (62,477.6/sq mi)
- Time zone: UTC+7 (ICT)
- Postal code: 10100
- Geocode: 1008

Pom Prap Sattru Phai (Thai: ป้อมปราบศัตรูพ่าย, pronounced [pɔ̂m pràːp sàt.trūː pʰâːj], or popularly just called Pom Prap, pronounced [pɔ̂m pràːp]) is one of the 50 districts (khet) of Bangkok, Thailand. Neighbouring districts are (from north clockwise) Dusit, Pathum Wan, Bang Rak, Samphanthawong, and Phra Nakhon. With more than 24,000 inhabitants per square kilometre (more than 62,000 per square mile) it is the district with the highest population density in Thailand.

== History ==
Pom Prap Sattru Phai was established in 1915 when the districts of Bangkok were overhauled and replaced by 25 amphoes (districts). Later, two of the original 25, Sam Yot and Nang Loeng, were merged into Pom Prap Sattru Phai.

The district was named after a fort (pom in Thai) south of present Nang Loeng Market. The fort was one of the eight new forts built along Khlong Phadung Krung Kasem during King Rama IV's reign. Its name literally means 'suppression of enemy fort'.

== Administration ==
District map

The district is divided into five sub-districts (khwaeng).

1.	Pom Prap	ป้อมปราบ
2.	Wat Thep Sirin	วัดเทพศิรินทร์
3.	Khlong Maha Nak	คลองมหานาค
4.	Ban Bat	บ้านบาตร
5.	Wat Sommanat	วัดโสมนัส

== Places ==
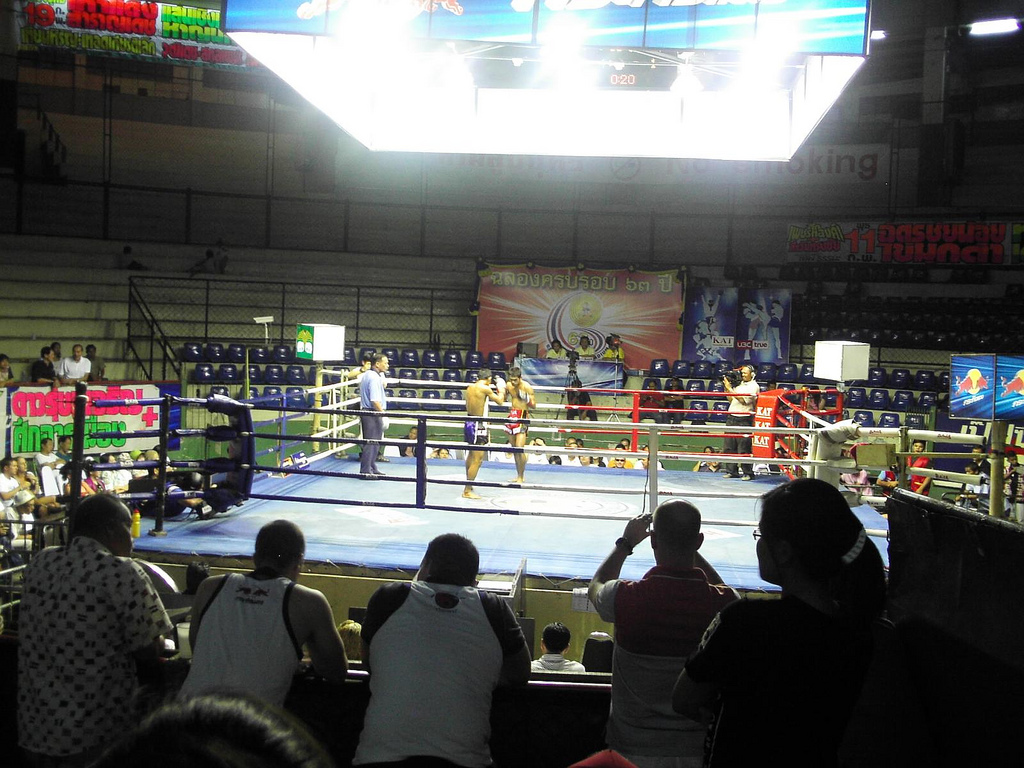
Inside Ratchadamnoen Boxing Stadium

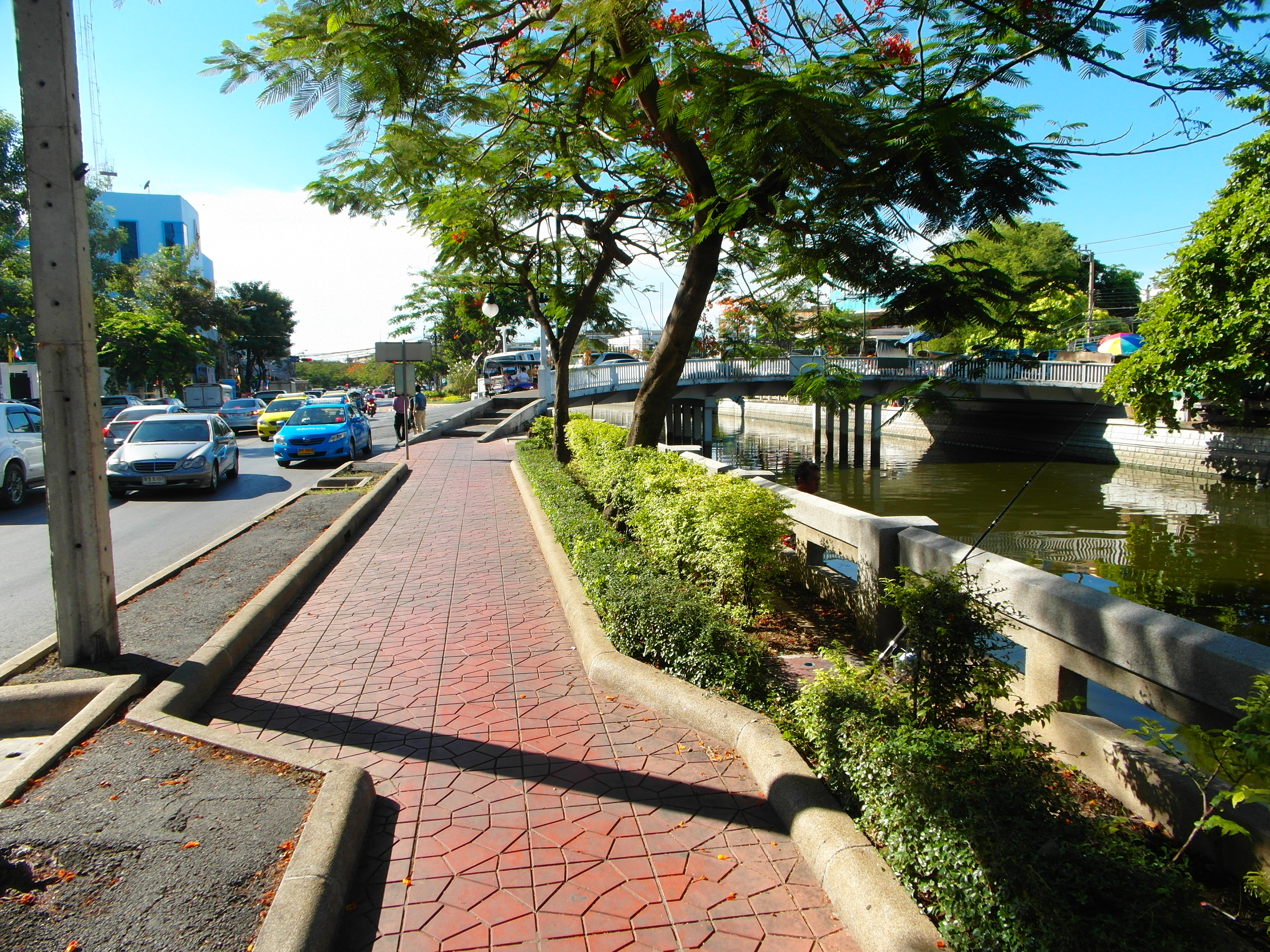
Krung Kasem Road in the area of Bobae Market by Khlong Phadung Krung Kasem

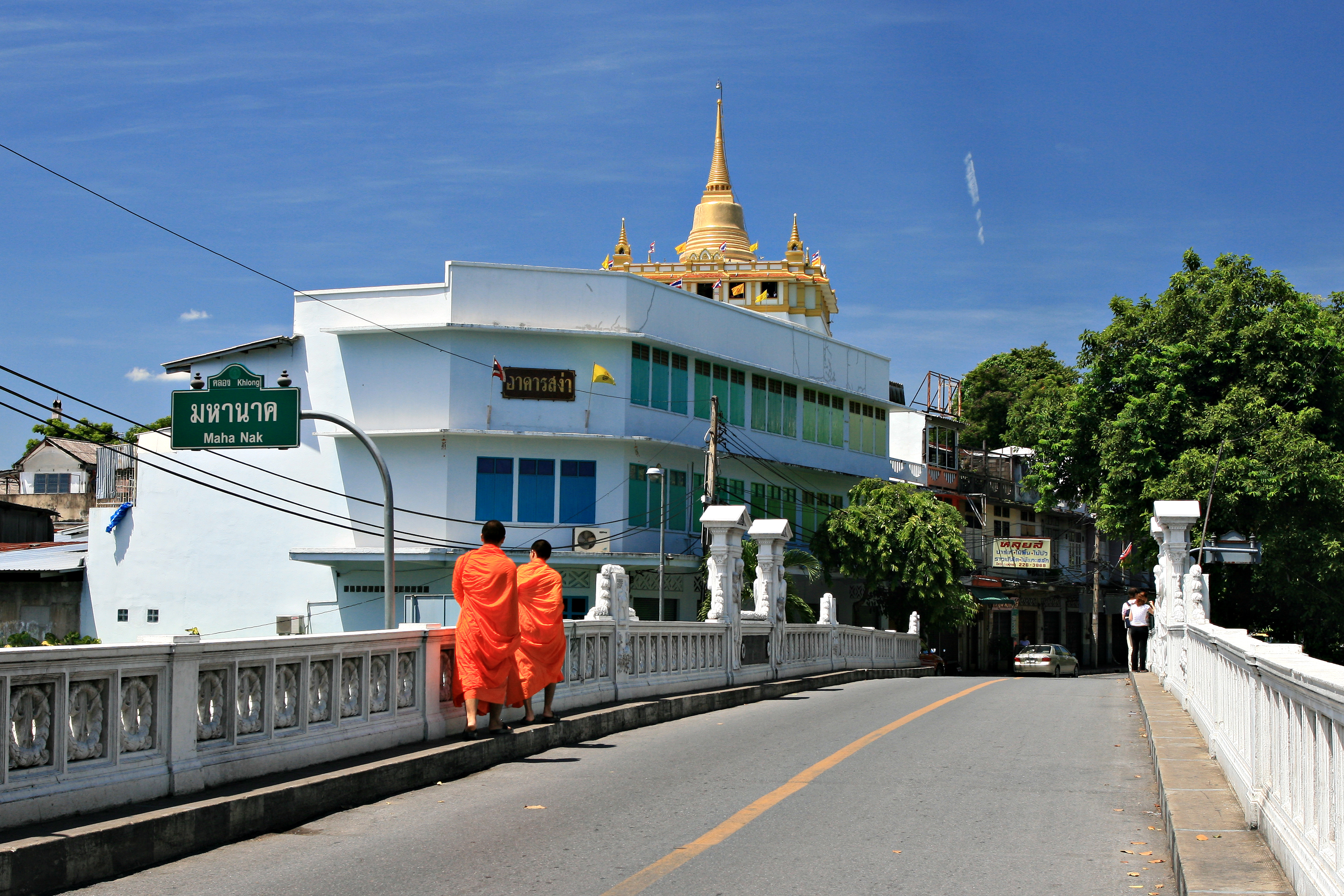
Mahat Thai Uthit Bridge and Paribatra Road, Golden Mount of Wat Saket in the distance

The Golden Mount (ภูเขาทอง or พระบรมบรรพต) inside Wat Saket (วัดสระเกศ) is probably the best known place in Pom Prap Sattru Phai. Its height is 63.6 m, making it easily seen from surrounding area. The chedi on the top is accessible via stairs circling up around the mount. The construction of Golden Mount began during King Rama III's reign but suffered from foundation stability problem. It was finished during the reign of King Rama V.

Wat Mangkon Kamalawat (วัดมังกรกมลาวาส) or Wat Leng Noei Yi (วัดเล่งเน่ยยี่) is the most famous Mahayana temple in Bangkok's Chinatown. It is crowded on special days such as Chinese New Year and Chinese Vegetarian Food Festival (in the 9th lunar month). The temple holds an annual The Krajat (เทกระจาด) to donate food and consumer goods to the poor in the 7th lunar month (part of Ghost Festival).

Tai Hong Kong Shrine (ศาลเจ้าไต้ฮงกง) is a Chinese shrine built to honor Tai Hong (1582–1670). Living in Guangdong, he helped people by giving food to the poor, treatment to the ill, and funerals for the dead who had no family. A group of merchants emigrated to Bangkok from China following the same path. With a donation from King Rama VI, the shrine was established. In 1937 the Poh Teck Tung Foundation was formed for rescue and charity work. It is opposite the shrine on Phlapphla Chai Road.

Other prominent temples in the district include Wat Thepsirin (also written Wat Depsirin) and Wat Phlapphla Chai with Wat Sommanat Wihan as well as Wat Khanikaphon.

Ratchadamnoen Boxing Stadium (also spelled "Rajadamnern") holds traditional Muay Thai (Thai boxing) matches and is an alternative leading boxing arena to Lumpinee Boxing Stadium.

Varadis Palace is the former residence of Prince Damrong Rajanubhab. Built in 1911 by the German architect Karl Dohring, it is in a large garden. After restoration in 1996, it houses the Prince Damrong Rachanupab Museum and Library.

King Prajadhipok Museum is the museum exhibitions relating to royal life of King Prajadhipok (Rama VII), located near Phan Fa Lilat Bridge. Its building used to be a Department of Public Works first.

Mahat Thai Uthit Bridge (สะพานมหาดไทยอุทิศ) is a historic bridge over Khlong Maha Nak near Phan Fa Lilat Bridge, Mahakan Fort, and Wat Saket. It was built to commemorate the death of King Rama V. Figures of ordinary people in mourning are featured on both sides, giving rise to its informal name Saphan Rong Hai (สะพานร้องไห้, lit. 'lamenting bridge'). It also marks the start of Paribatra Road, an alley connecting Ratchadamnoen Avenue with Yaowarat Road in Bangkok's Chinatown.

Metropolitan Waterworks Authority Office, also known as Waterworks Authority Maen Si, is the first head office of Metropolitan Waterworks Authority in Thailand built since the reign of King Rama VI. To date it is a remarkable historic building located on the corner of Maen Si Intersection near Wat Saket.

22 July Circle is the traffic circle where Maitri Chit intersects Santiphap and Mittraphan Roads. It was built to commemorate the time that Siam (now Thailand) announced its participation in the First World War according to the royal intention of King Rama VI. Nowadays, it is known as a centre for billboard and tires shops, include an area of Bangkok's sex industry too.

S.A.B. Intersection is four-way intersection of Charoen Krung and Worachak with Chakkrawat Roads overlaps Samphanthawong District, regarded as the first junction of Charoen Krung Road, counted from the Damrong Sathit Bridge, or familiarly known as Saphan Lek. On the corner of the intersection is the location of two striking historic Sino-Portuguese buildings, S.A.B. Building is now a head office of Sing Sian Yer Pao, Thailand's best selling Chinese newspaper and Siam Commercial Bank, Chaloem Nakhon Branch.

Berlin Pharmaceutical Museum is an outstanding Colonial building and former office of Dr. Chai Chainuvati, a physician who was an owner, located on the corner of Suea Pa Intersection. In 1932, he opened a clinic and dispensary here to treat general poor patients in Charoen Krung and Yaowarat neighbourhoods. Currently, it has become a three-story medicine museum and neat café run by his heir.

Soi Nana, a small alley near 22 July Circle, it has been renovated from old-fashioned shophouses to chic cafés to appeal to young people and hipsters.

== Markets ==
Bobae Market (ตลาดโบ๊เบ๊) is a major low-cost fabric mart. It is on a section of Krung Kasem Road between Lan Luang Road and Bamrung Mueang Road on the northeast border of the district. The area is currently under renovation by Bangkok Metropolitan Administration (BMA) and the market is closed.

Khlong Thom (คลองถม) is an electrical and electronics marketplace. It was once a night market where vendor stalls extended onto pavements and alleys. Goods, including second hand, or sometimes stolen, were available from Saturday night to Sunday morning. The night market has now been closed as part of pavement cleanup campaign since March 2015.

Nang Loeng (นางเลิ้ง) is a Thailand's oldest land market and historic neighbourhood.

Suea Pa (เสือป่า) is a centre of wholesale and retail for mobile phone accessories, IT and electric equipments.

== Festivals ==
Although traditional Thai temple fairs (งานวัด) are not commonly seen nowadays, one is held every year at the Golden Mount about the time of Loy Krathong. Ferris wheels, shooting galleries, Sao Noi Tok Nam (สาวน้อยตกน้ำ, lit. 'little lady falling into water') are common activities. There are also freak shows such as Mia Ngu (เมียงู, lit. 'snake's wife') with a woman living with a python.

== Transportation ==
Besides the usual road transportation, a boat service runs along Khlong Maha Nak and Khlong Saen Saep. The route begins at the stop near the Golden Mount and ends at Pratu Nam in Pathum Wan/Ratchathewi, there passengers can change boat to further destinations.

The district is currently served by one subway line, and will be by a second in the future. The MRT Blue Line has a station in Wat Mangkon which is in Samphanthawong district directly across the Charoen Krung Road from Pom Prap Sattru Phai. MRT Orange Line will also have station Lan Luang here.

== Government and infrastructure ==
Three Thai government ministries, The Ministry of Transport, the Ministry of Social Development and Human Security, and the Ministry of Tourism and Sports have head offices in the district.

== Economy ==
Thai Airways International operates the Larn Luang Office in Pom Prap Sattru Phai. The office used to be the head office of Thai Airways Company.

== Education ==
- Debsirin School
- Saipanya School Under the Royal Patronage of her Majesty the Queen School

== Politics ==
Pom Prap Sattru Phai is considered one of the Democrat Party's strongholds in Bangkok. In the 2026 Bangkok Metropolitan Council election, which was held concurrently with the Bangkok gubernatorial election, the constituency was won by Nipaparn Chuenglertsiri of the Democrat Party, a former Bangkok Metropolitan Council (BMC) member representing the same area. She is also the daughter of former Democrat Party Member of Parliament (MP) for the constituency, Jermmas Chuenglertsiri. She was one of eight successful Democrat Party candidates elected to the Bangkok Metropolitan Council in that election.

== Gallery ==
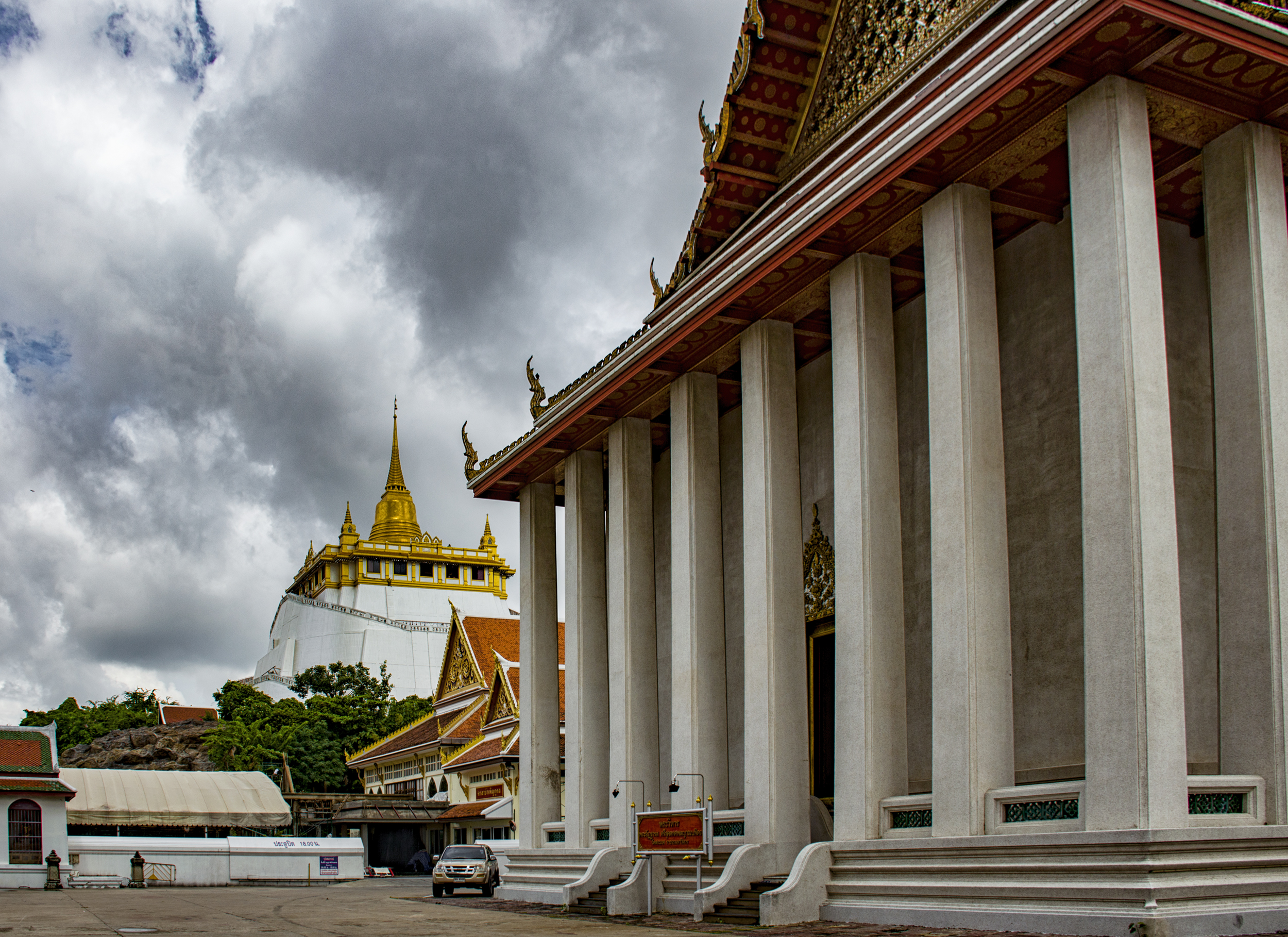
Golden Mount and ubosot (main hall) of Wat Saket

Wat Phlapphla Chai

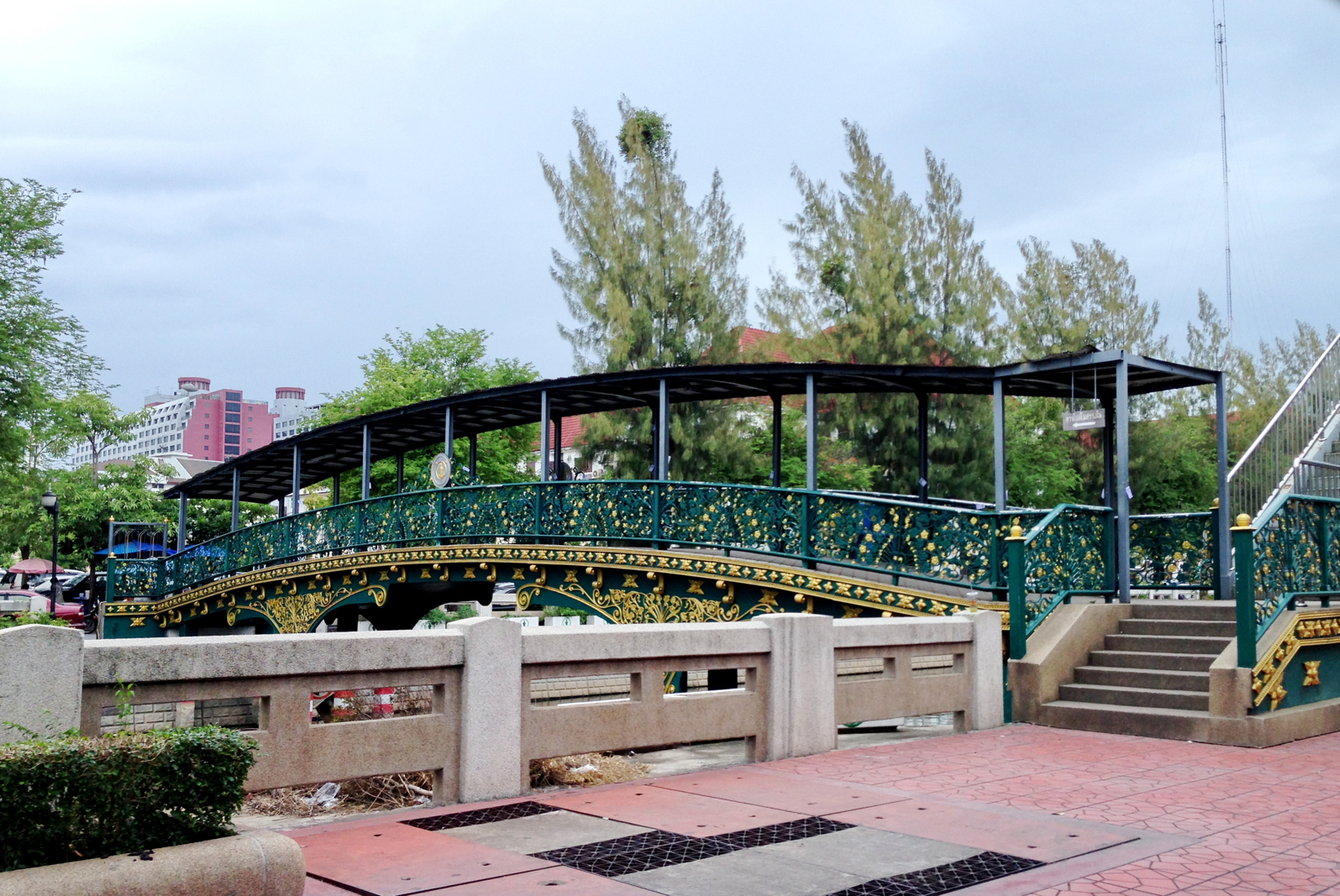
Wrought iron bridge over Khlong Phadung Krung Kasem connects SRT in Pathum Wan with Debsirin School in Pom Prap Sattru Phai (seen from Pom Prap Sattru Phai)

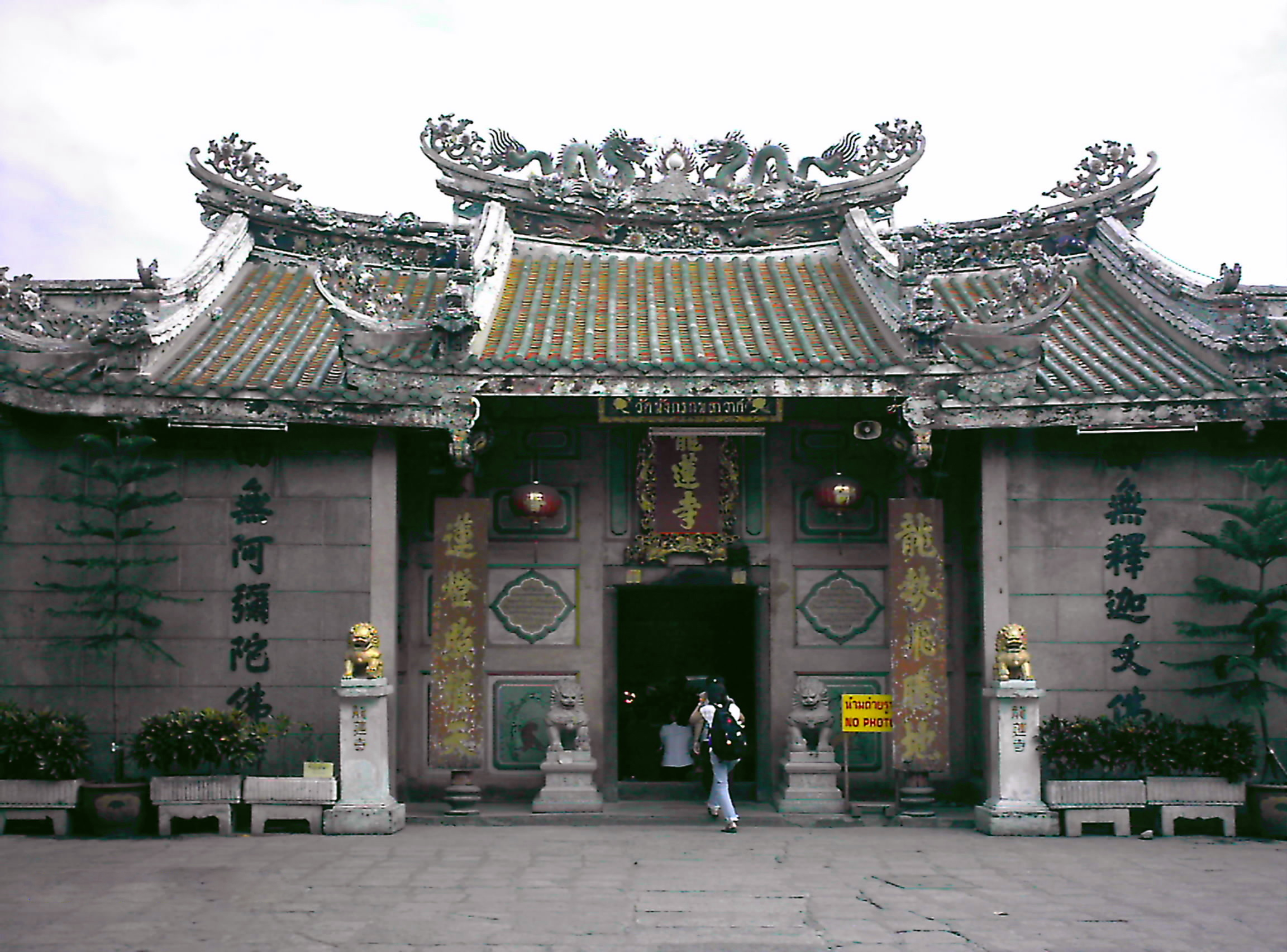
Wat Mangkon Kamalawat

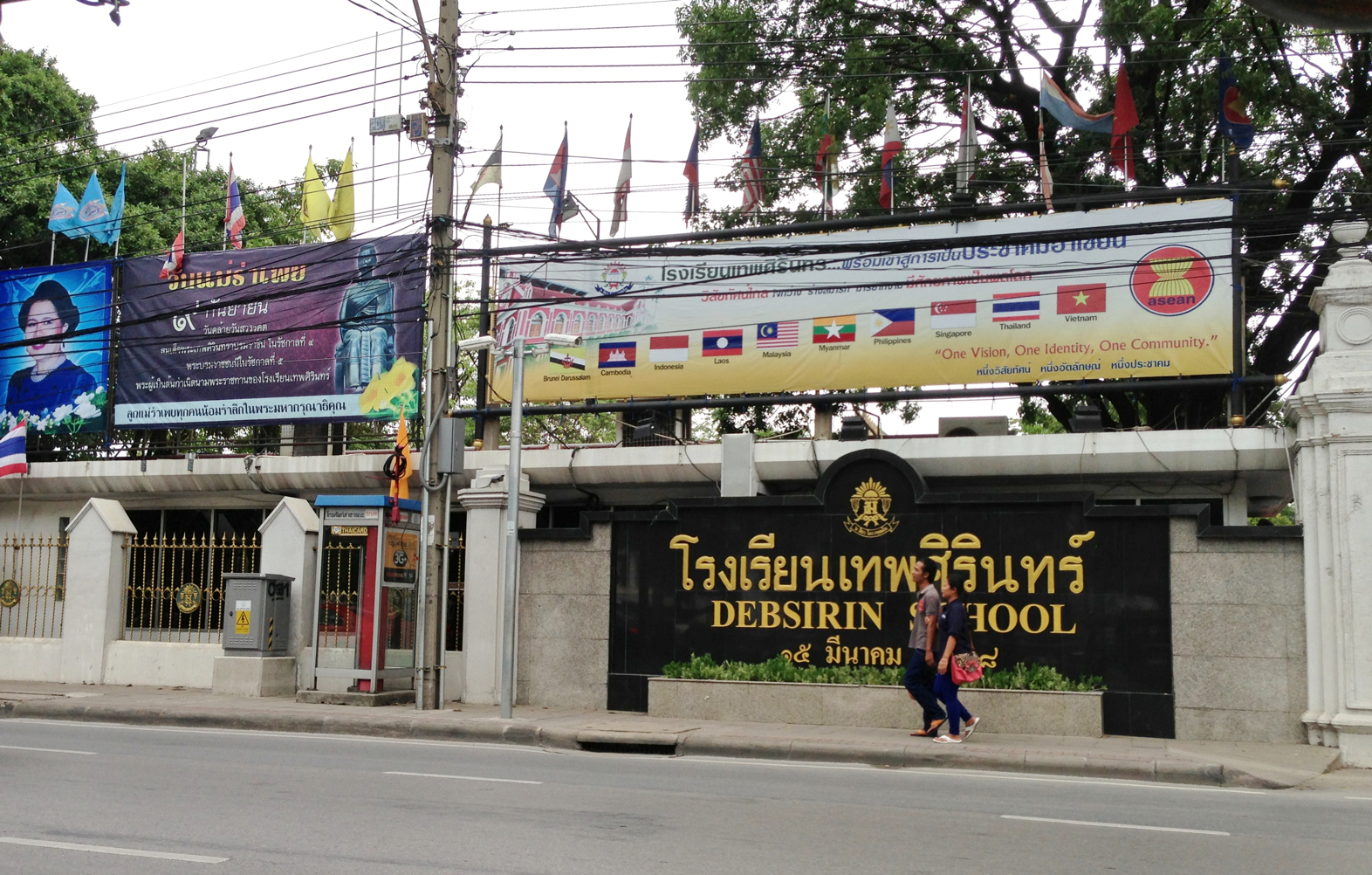
Debsirin School

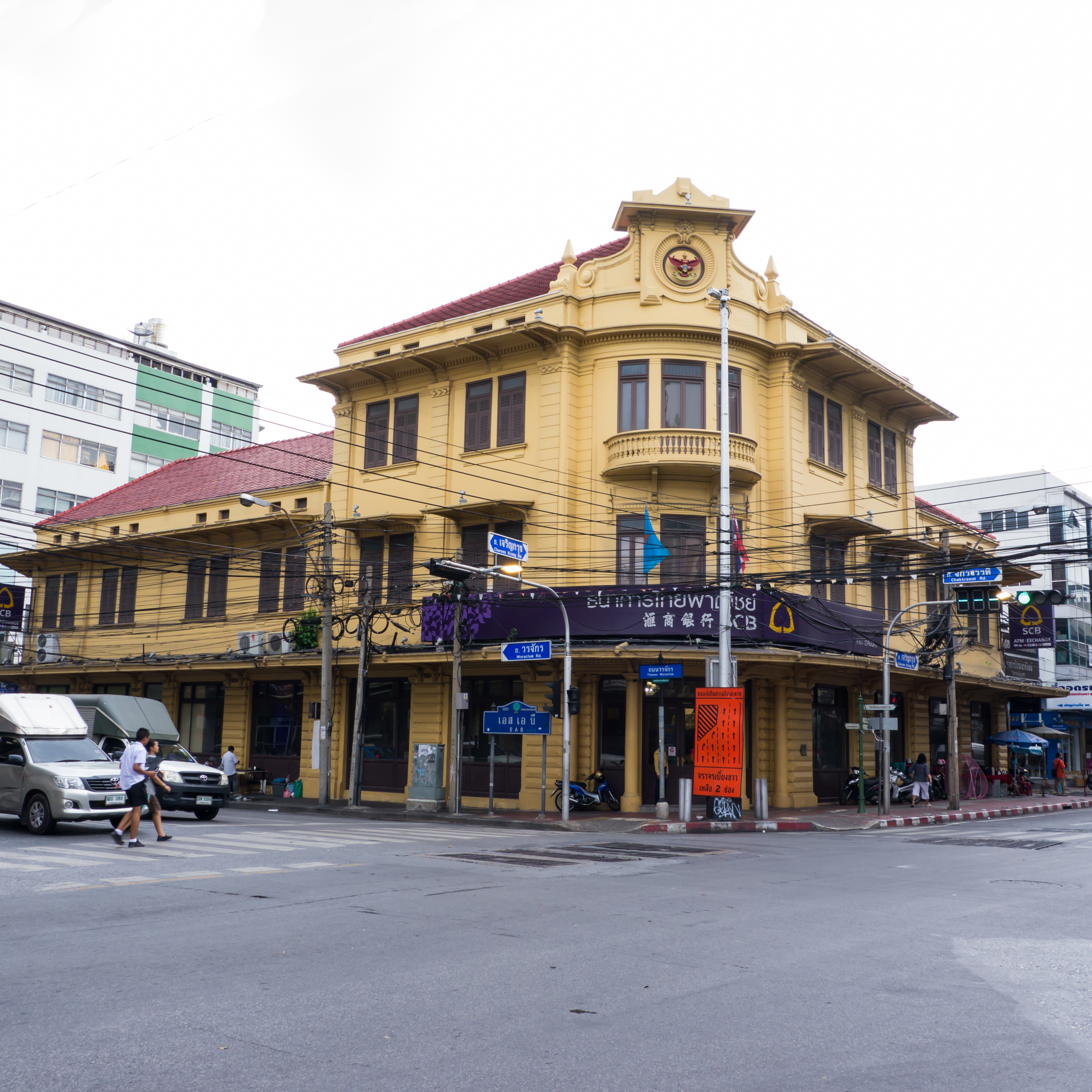
S.A.B. Intersection

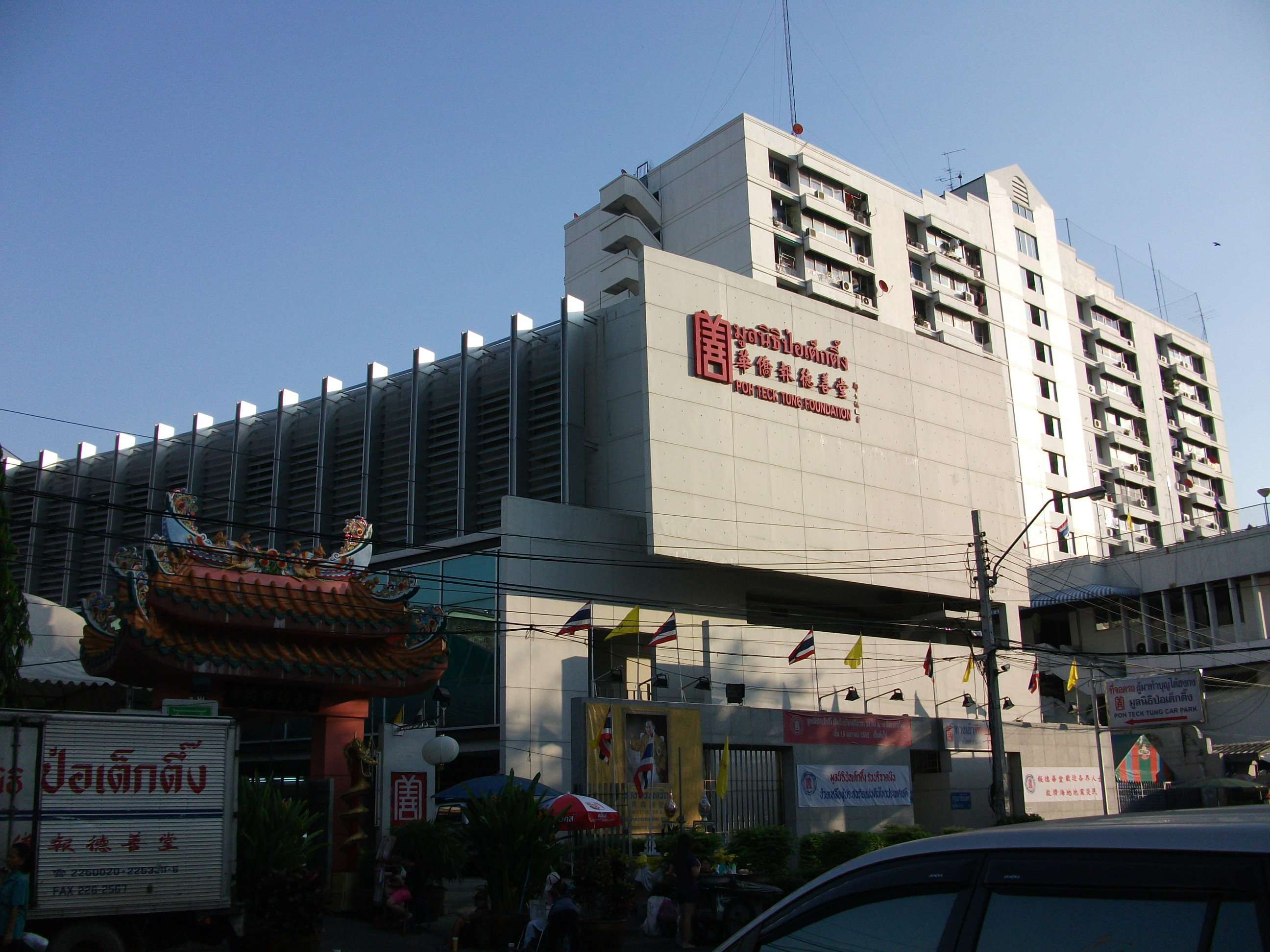
Headquarters of Poh Teck Tung Foundation on Phlapphla Chai Road

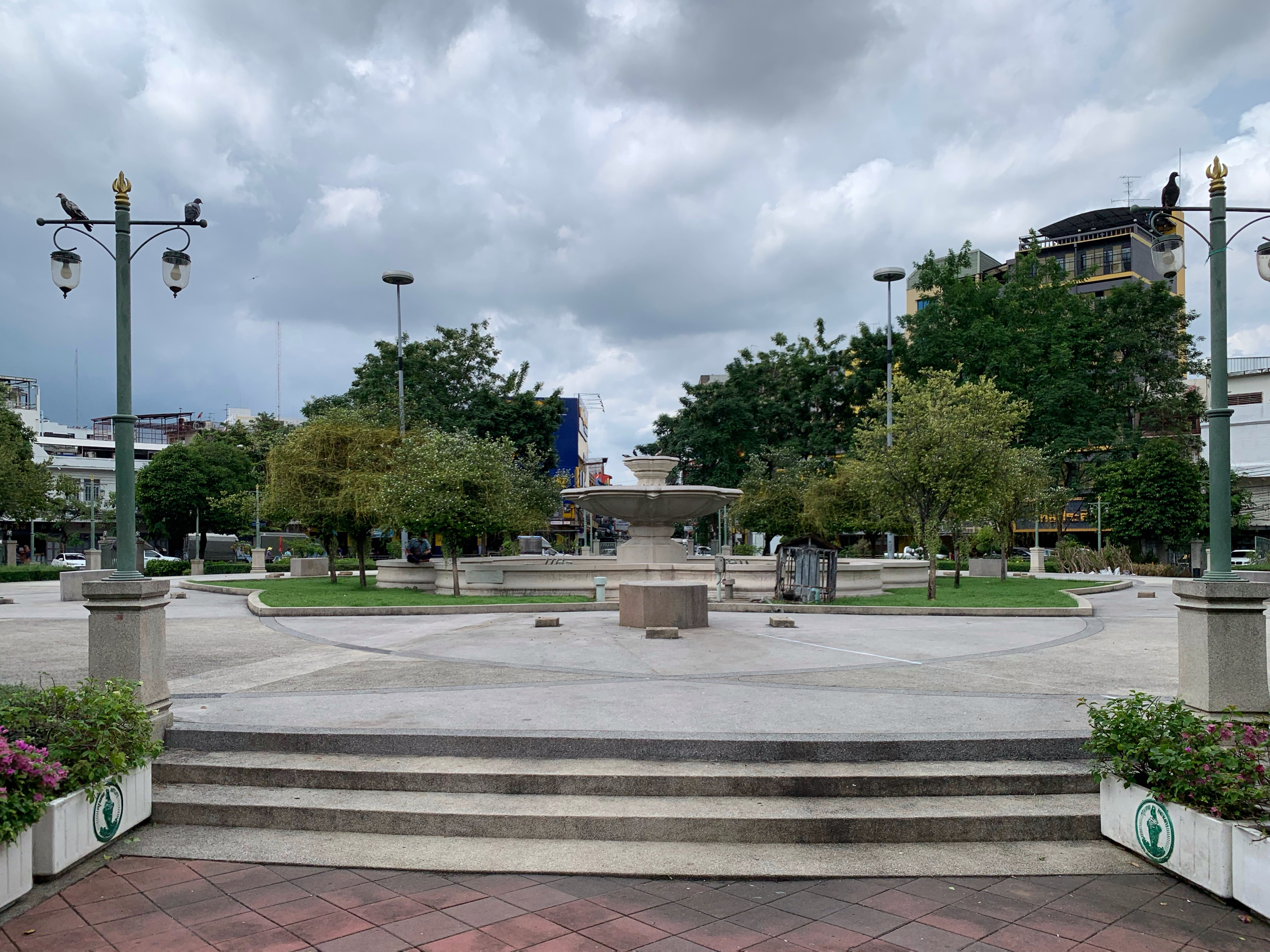
22 July Circle

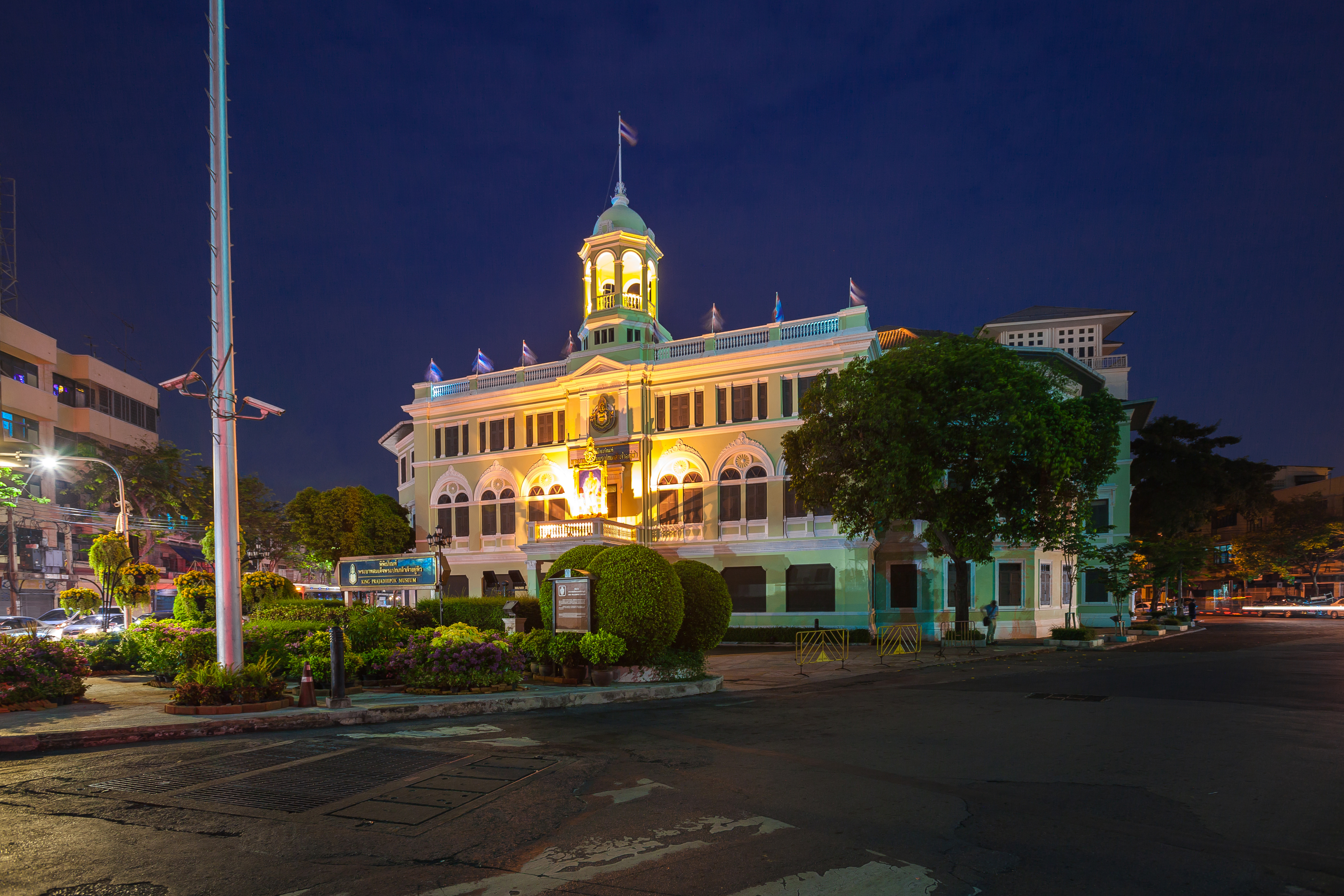
King Prajadhipok Museum

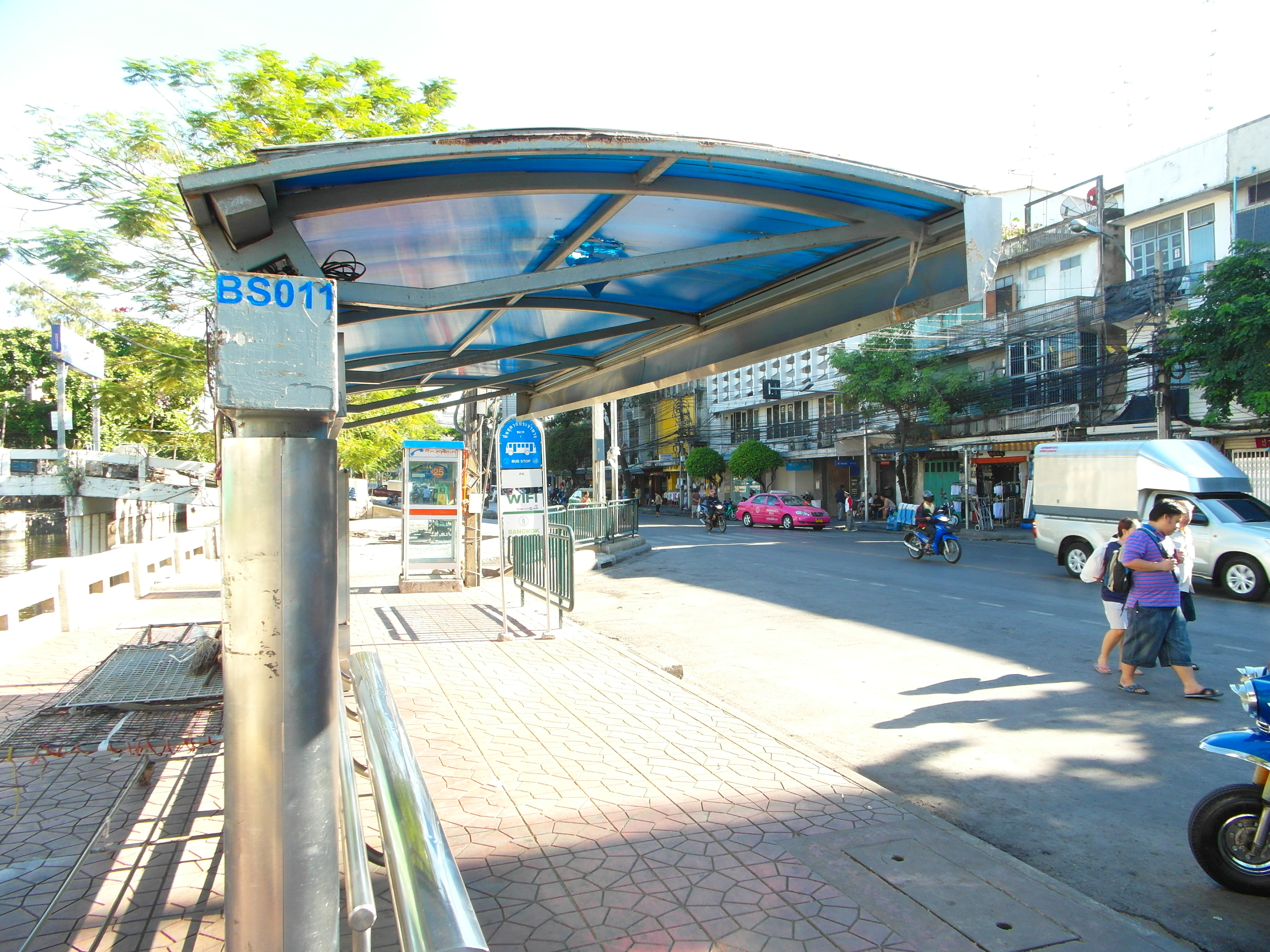
Bus stop at Bobae Market
