= Star News =

Star News may refer to:

- Star News Group, an Australian media company based in Pakenham, Victoria
- ABP News (previously STAR News), an Indian news channel
- The McCall Star-News is a weekly newspaper in McCall Idaho
- Pasadena Star-News, a paid local daily newspaper for Pasadena, California
- Star-News, the daily newspaper for Wilmington, North Carolina
- The Star-News (Chula Vista), a community newspaper in Southern California
- Star News Asia, the flagship daily evening television news programmes from Hong Kong on STAR World
- Star News (South Korea), a South Korean news website
- Star News (Bangladesh), a Bangladeshi news channel
- Star News, online name for New Zealand weekly newspaper The Star

== See also ==
- News Star (disambiguation)
- Star TV (disambiguation)
- Sin Poh (disambiguation)
- Sing Pao (disambiguation)
