= Worachak Road =

Road and neighbourhood in Bangkok, Thailand

Coordinates: 13°44′52.96″N 100°30′25.20″E

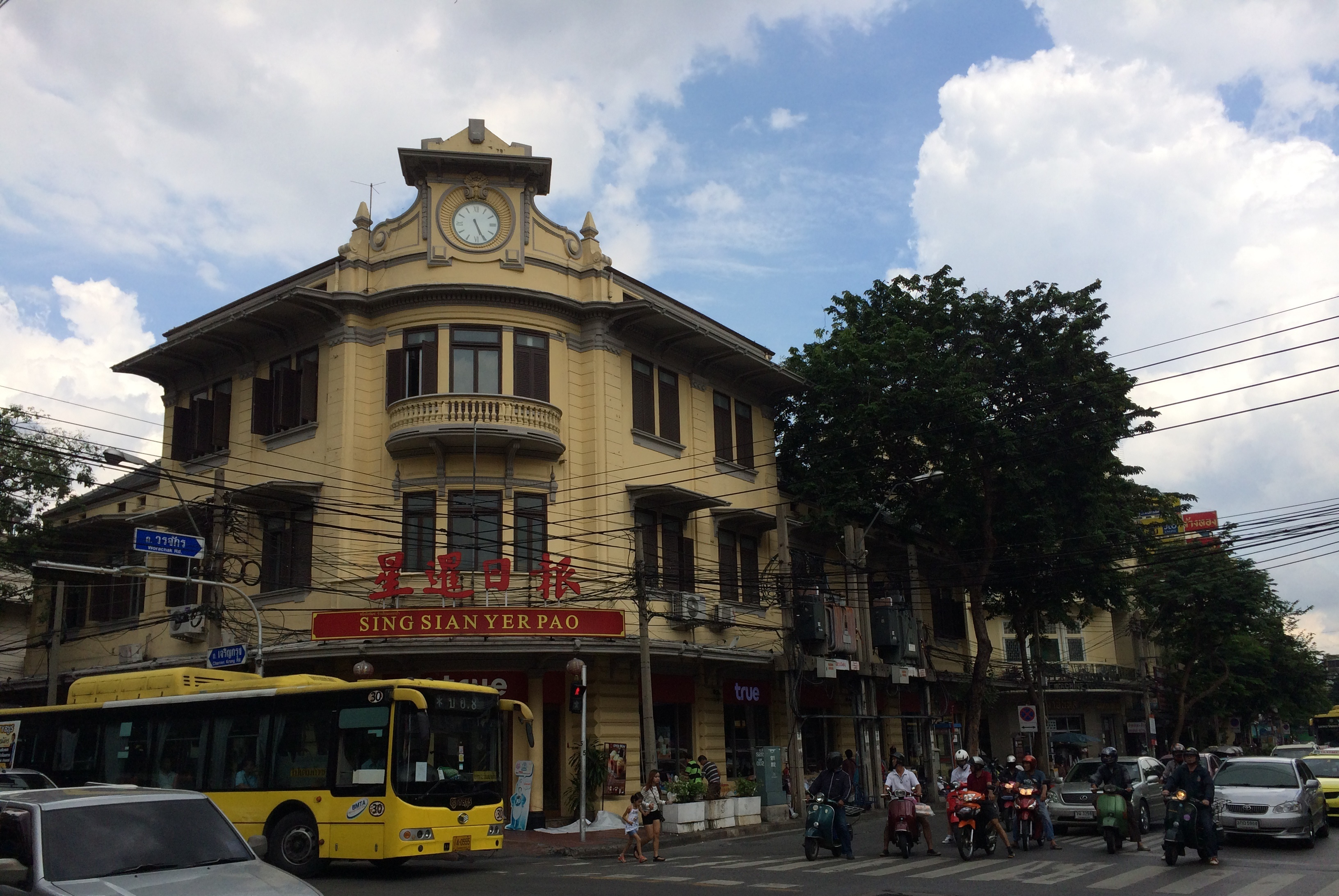
Worachak road at S.A.B. intersection visiting S.A.B. building (Sing Sian Yer Pao headquarters (seen from Charoen Krung road)

Worachak Road (Thai: ถนนวรจักร, RTGS: Thanon Worachak, pronounced [tʰā.nǒn wɔ̄ː.rā.t͡ɕàk]) is a road and neighbourhood in Bangkok. It is a short road in the area of Pom Prap Sattru Phai district and administrative boundary between the Ban Bat, Pom Prap and Wat Thep Sirin sub-districts. It starts from the S.A.B. intersection in the Samphanthawong district and ends at Maen Si intersection near Wat Saket in Pom Prap Sattru Phai district.

It is named after HRH, Prince Pramoj, Prince Worachak, the son of King Phutthaloetla Naphalai (Rama II) and grandfather of M.R. Seni Pramoj and M.R. Kukrit Pramoj, who used to have the palace at this road cut through.

Worachak road built in 1898 during the reign of King Chulalongkorn (Rama V) after the project since 1896. There once was a Chaloem Yot 45 bridge located here but it was dismantled to open the way to the road.

Currently, around Worachak road is a source of auto, motorbike and bicycle parts distributors. It's considered part of Khlong Thom. It's a destination for various street food vendors alike nearby Yaowarat road as well.
