= Sing Pao (disambiguation) =

Sing Pao Daily News (Chinese: 成報; pinyin: Chéng Bào; Jyutping: sing^{4} bou^{3}) is a Hong Kong–based Chinese language newspaper.

Sing Pao may also refer to:

- Sing Tao Daily, also known as Sing Tao Jih Pao, a Hong Kong newspaper
  - Sing Tao Wan Pao, a defunct evening edition of Sing Tao Daily; see Sing Tao Holdings
- Sing Sian Yer Pao, a Thai Chinese-language newspaper
  - Sing Thai Wan Pao, a defunct evening edition of Sing Sian Yer Pao

== See also ==
- Sin Poh (disambiguation)
- Star News (disambiguation)
