= List of programmes broadcast by Star World =

The following is a list of programmes broadcast by Star World and Star World Premiere.

== Animation ==
- American Dad!
- Archer
- The Boss Baby: Back in Business
- Dilbert
- Family Guy
- Futurama
- The Simpsons
- Son of Zorn

== Comedy-drama ==
- Ally McBeal
- Backstrom
- Ballers
- Barry
- Baskets
- Better Things
- Boston Legal
- Bunheads
- Californication
- Crashing
- Crazy Ex-Girlfriend
- Curb Your Enthusiasm
- Devious Maids
- Divorce
- Ed
- Eli Stone
- Entourage
- Goodness Gracious Me
- The Good Guys
- Insecure
- Las Vegas
- Louie
- Monk
- Lipstick Jungle
- Miss Match
- Mr Inbetween
- Nurse Jackie
- Packed to the Rafters
- Parenthood
- Psych
- Rake
- Royal Pains
- Sex & Drugs & Rock & Roll
- Scream Queens
- Scrubs
- Togetherness
- Ugly Betty
- Veep
- Wild Card
- The Wonder Years

== Drama ==
- 90210
- 9-1-1
- 7th Heaven
- 24: Legacy
- Adventure Inc.
- The Adventures of Sinbad
- The Affair
- Agent Carter
- Agents of S.H.I.E.L.D.
- The Americans
- American Horror Story
- Angel
- Angels in America
- APB
- Arrow (Season 1–3; moved to Colors Infinity)
- The Assassination of Gianni Versace
- Band of Brothers
- Banshee
- The Bastard Executioner
- Baywatch
- Betrayal
- Beyond the Break
- Beverly Hills, 90210
- Big Little Lies
- The Blacklist
- Blood & Oil
- Boardwalk Empire
- The Bold and the Beautiful
- Bones
- Bosch
- Boston Public
- Breaking Bad
- Breakout Kings
- The Bridge
- Buffy the Vampire Slayer
- Burn Notice
- Canterbury Tales
- Castle
- C.B. Strike
- Chance
- Charmed
- Chernobyl
- The Chi
- Chicago Hope
- The Closer
- Cold Case
- Combat Hospital
- Criminal Minds
- Criminal Minds: Suspect Behavior
- Damien
- Day Break
- Dead of Summer
- Desire
- Desperate Housewives
- Detroit 1-8-7
- Dexter
- Dirty Sexy Money
- Downton Abbey
- Empire
- The Exorcist
- Falcon Beach
- The Family
- Fashion House
- Feud
- Filthy Rich
- Fosse/Verdon
- Game of Thrones
- Gang Related
- General Hospital
- Ghost Whisperer
- The Gifted
- Glee
- Grey's Anatomy (Seasons 1–6; moved to Zee Café)
- The Hardy Boys
- Here & Now
- Heroes
- His Dark Materials
- Home and Away
- Homeland
- House
- How to Get Away with Murder
- Intelligence
- JAG
- Jett
- The Jinx
- Karen Sisco
- The Killing
- The Knick
- Knight Rider (1982)
- Knight Rider (2008)
- Law & Order
- The Leftovers
- Lie to Me
- Lights Out
- Lilyhammer
- The Listener
- Lois & Clark: The New Adventures of Superman
- Lost
- Lucky 7
- Luther
- Mad Men
- Mayans M.C.
- The Mentalist
- Miami Vice
- Mildred Pierce
- Missing (2012)
- The Missing (2014)
- Mosaic
- Mrs. America
- Murder, She Wrote
- NCIS (Seasons 1–6; moved to AXN)
- Necessary Roughness
- Neighbours
- The Newsroom
- The Night Of
- NYPD Blue
- The O.C.
- Olive Kitteridge
- Once Upon a Time
- One Tree Hill
- The Pacific
- Pan Am
- The Passage
- The People v. O. J. Simpson
- Person of Interest
- Pitch
- Pose
- The Practice
- Prison Break
- Private Practice
- Proven Innocent
- Quantico
- Quarry
- Queen of the South
- Rectify
- The Resident
- Revenge
- Rome
- Room 104
- Rosewood
- Santa Barbara
- Sharp Objects
- Shots Fired
- Show Me a Hero
- The Shield
- Six Degrees
- Sleepy Hollow
- Smallville
- Snowfall
- Sons of Anarchy
- The Sopranos
- Star
- The Strain
- Strike Back
- Succession
- Supernatural (Season 1–5; moved to AXN)
- Teen Wolf (Season 1–3; shared with AXN)
- Terra Nova
- Third Watch
- This Is Us
- Touch
- Trauma
- Tru Calling
- True Blood
- True Detective
- Trust
- Unforgettable
- Unreal
- Victoria
- Vinyl
- The Walking Dead
- Walker, Texas Ranger
- Warrior
- Watchmen
- White Collar
- The Wire
- Xena: Warrior Princess
- Zero Hour

== News ==
Aside from entertainment, STAR World also aired news programming in the late 2000s.

- Businessweek Asia
- Sky News: 9 pm edition (Mondays)
- Sky News: 15 minutes (Tuesday - Saturday)
- Sports Update
- Star News Asia

== Reality ==
- American Idol
- American Music Awards
- America's Got Talent
- The Apprentice
- Are You Smarter Than a 5th Grader?
- Asia's Next Top Model
- The Bachelor (Season 1–11; moved to Colors Infinity)
- The Bachelorette (Season 1–3; moved to Colors Infinity)
- Beauty and the Geek
- Best Time Ever with Neil Patrick Harris
- Britain's Got Talent
- Cops
- Criss Angel Mindfreak
- Culinary Genius
- Dancing with the Stars
- The Dewarists
- Gordon Ramsay's 24 Hours to Hell and Back
- I Dare You: The Ultimate Challenge
- I'm a Celebrity...Get Me Out of Here!
- Impact! Xplosion
- Joe Millionaire
- Killer Camp
- K-Pop Star Hunt
- MasterChef Asia
- MasterChef Australia
- MasterChef Australia All-Stars
- MasterChef Australia Junior
- MasterChef Australia: The Professionals
- MasterChef US
- MasterChef Junior
- Miss Universe
- Miss USA
- Most Haunted
- My Big Fat Obnoxious Fiance
- On the Lot
- Outback Jack
- Primetime Emmy Awards
- Project Runway
- Q'Viva! The Chosen
- The Rachel Zoe Project
- Repeat After Me
- Rock Star
- The Simple Life
- Scare Tactics
- Sports Illustrated Swimsuit Model Search
- Temptation Island
- Twist of Taste: Coastal Curries
- The Voice
- WCW Monday Nitro
- WCW Thunder
- Whose Line Is It Anyway?
- WWE Raw

== Science fiction ==
- Almost Human
- Bionic Woman
- Colony (shared with Zee Café)
- Dark Angel
- Devs
- Doctor Who (moved from FX)
- Eureka
- Helix
- Kyle XY
- Minority Report
- Mutant X
- The Orville
- Revolution
- Roswell
- Second Chance
- Small Wonder
- Stargate SG-1
- Star Trek: Enterprise
- Warehouse 13
- Wayward Pines
- Westworld
- The X-Files

== Sitcoms ==
- 2 Broke Girls
- 8 Simple Rules
- 3rd Rock from the Sun
- 30 Rock
- According to Jim
- Angel from Hell
- Arrested Development
- Baby Daddy
- Becker
- Benched
- The Big Bang Theory (Season 1–10; moved to Zee Café)
- Black-ish
- Community
- The Cool Kids
- Cooper Barrett's Guide to Surviving Life
- The Crazy Ones
- Crumbs
- Dads
- Dharma & Greg
- Everybody Loves Raymond
- The Drew Carey Show
- Episodes
- Frasier
- Fresh Off the Boat
- Friends
- Ghosted
- The Goldbergs
- Grandfathered
- The Grinder
- Happy Days
- Home Improvement
- How I Met Your Mother
- It's Always Sunny in Philadelphia
- Jake in Progress
- The Jane Show
- LA to Vegas
- Just Shoot Me!
- The Kumars at No. 42
- Last Man Standing
- The Last Man on Earth
- Life in Pieces
- Little Britain
- Making History
- Malcolm in the Middle
- Manhattan Love Story
- Melissa & Joey
- The Mick
- Mind Your Language
- Modern Family
- Mom (Season 1–2; moved to Comedy Central)
- Mrs. Fletcher
- Mr. Sunshine
- The Muppets
- Mystery Girls
- My Wife & Kids
- The Neighbors
- New Girl
- The New Normal
- The Odd Couple
- The Office UK
- The Office US
- Outmatched
- Perfect Harmony
- Raising Hope
- Rel
- Rules of Engagement
- Sabrina the Teenage Witch
- Seinfeld
- Silicon Valley
- Single Parents
- Sons & Daughters
- Speechless
- Stark Raving Mad
- Still Standing
- Suburgatory
- That '70s Show
- Trophy Wife
- Two and a Half Men
- Two Guys and a Girl
- Vice Principals
- Welcome to the Family
- What We Do in the Shadows
- Yes, Dear

== Talk shows ==
- A Little Late with Lilly Singh
- Asia Uncut
- The Ellen DeGeneres Show (Season 1–11; moved to Romedy Now)
- Front Row with Anupama Chopra
- Hollywood Shootout
- Jimmy Kimmel Live!
- Koffee with Karan
- The Late Show with Stephen Colbert
- The Oprah Winfrey Show
- Rendezvous with Simi Garewal
- Satyamev Jayate
- Simi Selects India's Most Desirable
- The Tara Sharma Show
- TED Talks India Nayi Soch
