= Jermmas Chuenglertsiri =

Thai politician

- เจิมมาศ จึงเลิศศิริ
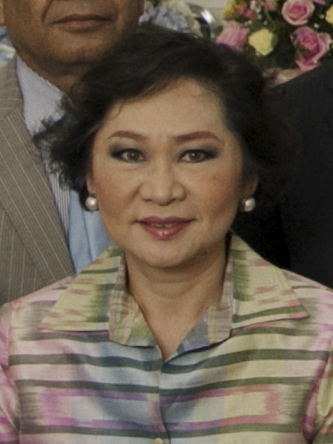
- Jermmas in 2012
- Born: 9 July 1959 (age 67); Bangkok, Thailand
- Education: Ramkhamhaeng University; NIDA
- Occupation: Politician
- Political party: Democrat
- Spouse: Ek Chuenglertsiri (died in 22 March 2020)
- Children: Nipapan Chuenglertsiri; Nipaporn Chuenglertsiri

Jermmas Chuenglertsiri (Thai: เจิมมาศ จึงเลิศศิริ) is a Thai female politician who represented Bangkok (constituency one: Phra Nakhon, Pom Prap Sattru Phai, Samphanthawong) in the House of Representatives.

Jermmas was born on 9 July 1959 in a Thai-Chinese family in Bangkok, but she cannot speak or understand Chinese very well. She graduated from Faculty of Political Science, Ramkhamhaeng University and received a master's degree from National Institute of Development Administration (NIDA).

She started her career as a member of the Bangkok Metropolitan Council (BMC), Pom Prap Sattru Phai (two terms). She did not have any interest in politics at first, but she was persuaded by Ek Chuenglertsiri, her husband, who has been an election canvasser of the Democrat Party since 1988. Ek has helped with the campaign for many Democrat MPs such as Marut Bunnag, Dr. Supachai Panitchpakdi, M.R. Sukhumbhand Paribatra, etc.

Jermmas became the first MP from the 2005 general election and has been MP since then (three terms to the present). By the 2005 election, she was one of four MPs of the Democrat Party in Bangkok (Jermmas Chuenglertsiri, M.L. Apimongkol Sonakul, Korn Chatikavanij, Ong-Ard Klampaiboon respectively). And she was the only Democrat MP who won against incumbents from the Thai Rak Thai Party.

In 2018 she was one of executive board-of-directors of the Democrat Party.

In the election of a new Democrat Party leader in November 2018, she was appointed as one of the five election commission of the party. In the election on March 24, 2019, she was a candidate for election in Bangkok's one constituency, consisting of Phra Nakhon, Pom Prap Sattru Phai, Samphanthawong and Dusit (except Thanon Nakhon Chai Si). She was not elected, losing to Karnkanit Heawsantati, the female candidate from the Palang Pracharath Party.

In the 2022 Bangkok gubernatorial election, where members of the BMC were elected at the same time, her daughter Nipapan "Gub" Chuenglertsiri was also elected as a representative in Pom Prap Sattru Phai district. She was one of nine Democrats elected this time.
