= S.A.B. Intersection =

Coordinates: 13°44′44″N 100°30′20″E

S.A.B.
- เอส. เอ. บี.
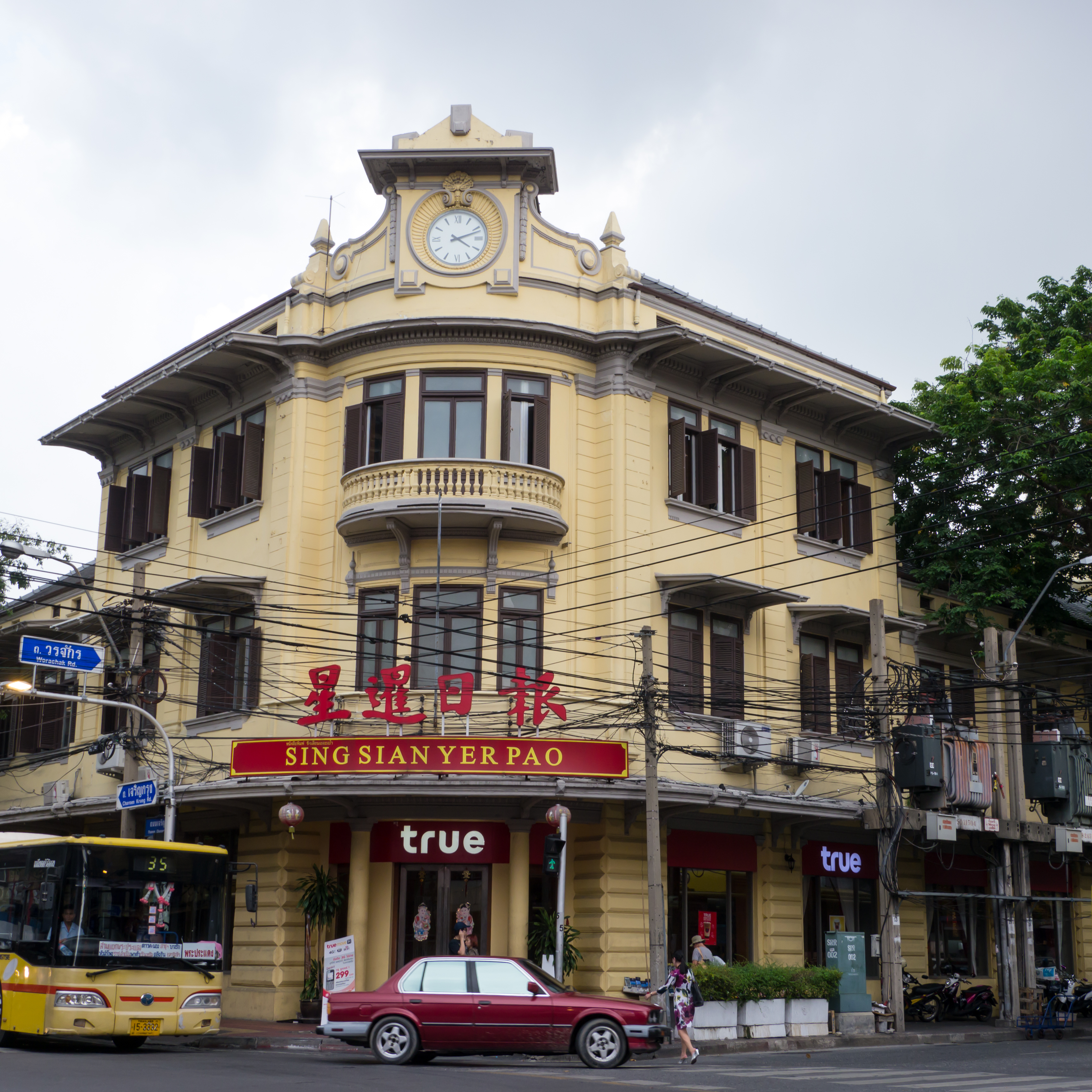
- S.A.B. Building

Location
- Pom Prap and Ban Bat, Pom Prap Sattru Phai and Samphanthawong, Samphanthawong, Bangkok, Thailand
- Roads at junction: Worachak (northeast); Charoen Krung (southeast–northwest); Chakkrawat (southwest)

Construction
- Type: Four-way at-grade intersection

S.A.B. Intersection (Thai: แยกเอส. เอ. บี., pronounced [jɛ̂ːk ʔés ʔēː bīː]) is formed by the intersection of Charoen Krung and Worachak with Chakkrawat roads in Bangkok's Pom Prap Sattru Phai and Samphanthawong Districts near Khlong Thom area. The boundaries of the intersection are considered to be where Worachak road ends, and where Chakkrawat road emerge.

It was originally called Worachak Intersection after the road, but became known as S.A.B. after the Belgian import company Société Anonyme Belge which established its office and store on the northern corner in 1912. The building now hosts the offices of Sing Sian Yer Pao newspaper.

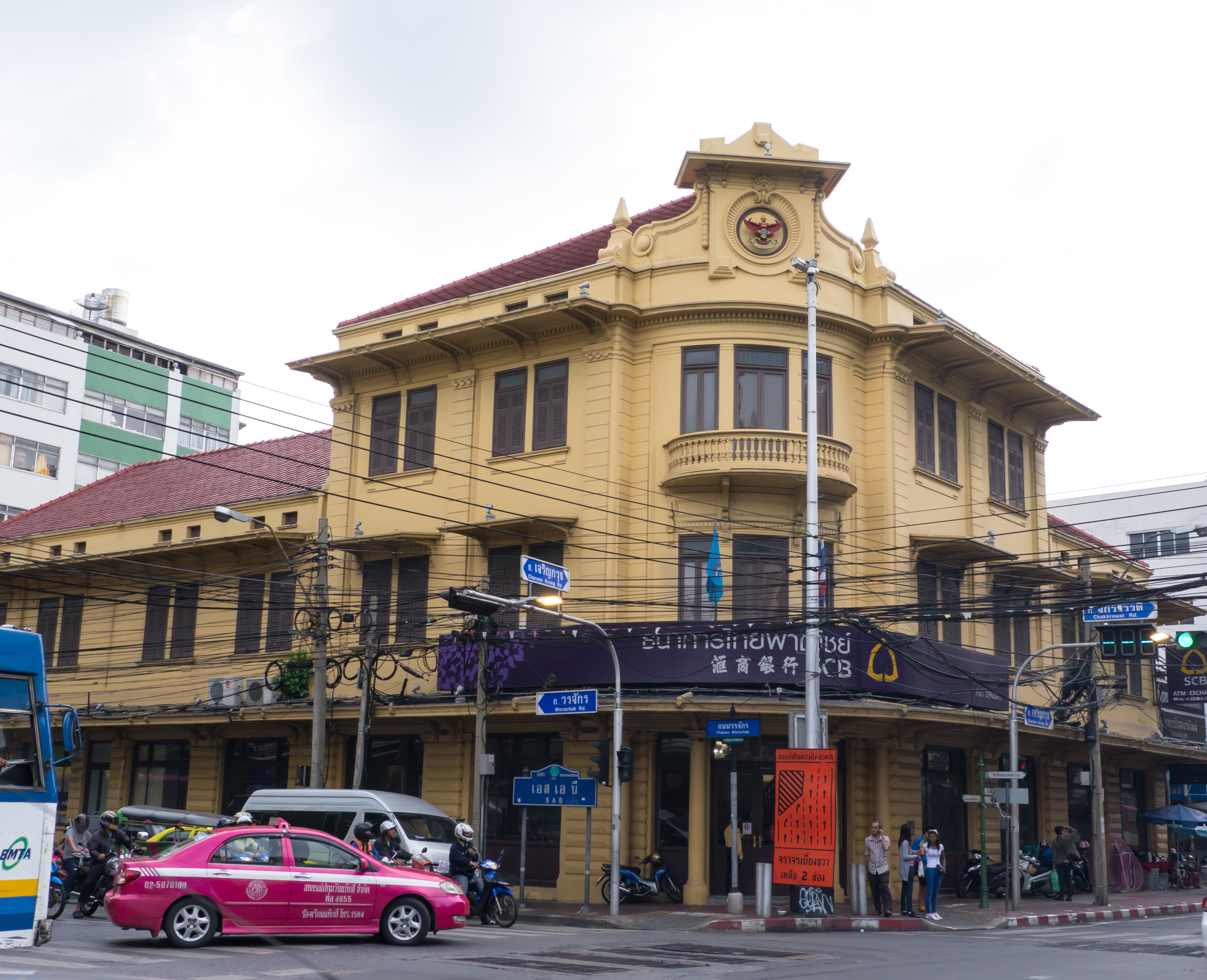
S.E.C. Building

Opposite the S.A.B. Building on the junction's eastern corner is the near-identical S.E.C. Building, also originally a leading department store. It is now the site of the Chaloem Nakhon Branch of Siam Commercial Bank. Both buildings are registered ancient monuments, and the Siam Commercial Bank building received the ASA Architectural Conservation Award in 2007.
