= News Star =

News Star or News-Star is the name of several newspapers:

- The News-Star, in Monroe, Louisiana
- News-Star (Chicago), in Chicago, Illinois
- The Shawnee News-Star, in Shawnee, Oklahoma
- News and Star, a local tabloid newspaper in Cumbria, UK
- Waterford News & Star, a local newspaper in Waterford, Ireland

== See also ==
- Star News (disambiguation)
