= Berlin Pharmaceutical Museum =

Medical museum in Bangkok, Thailand

Coordinates: 13.7438°N 100.5082°E

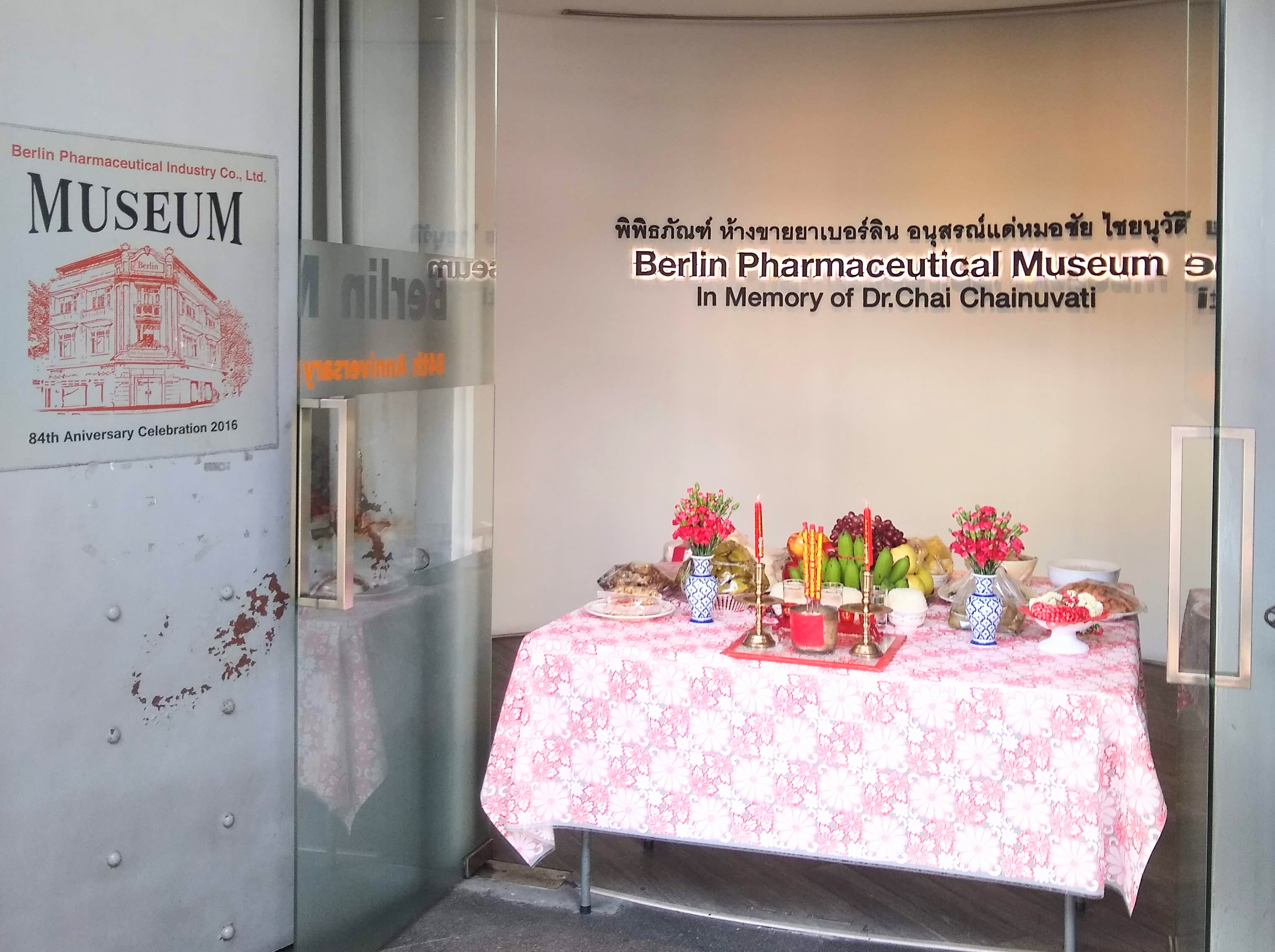
- Established: 2016
- Location: Charoen Krung Road junction with Sua Pa, Bangkok, Thailand
- Owner: Berlin Pharmaceutical Industry Co Ltd

Berlin Pharmaceutical Museum is a medical museum situated on Charoen Krung Road, Bangkok, Thailand. It describes the history of Western medicine in Thailand, and houses memorabilia connected with the life of the late Dr Chai Chainuvati, a pioneer of Western medical treatment.

== Purpose ==
Opened in 2016, the museum commemorates the life of the late Dr Chai Chainuvati who operated a private clinic called the "Berlin Dispensary" in the building. The son of Chinese immigrants, he graduated with a degree in modern medicine from Tongji German Medical School (today Tongji University), opened the clinic and dispensary in 1932, and was among the earliest to offer Western medicine, while also providing free treatment to the poor. The museum also seeks to educate the public by providing information about the development of Western medicine and drug-making in Thailand.

== Collection ==
The museum is divided into three sections. The first section provides an exhibition about Dr Chainuvati's life and work including family photographs, personal documents and memorabilia. The second section features mock-ups of the clinic, including his office containing writing desk, examination table, and equipment, and of the dispensary area. The final section displays information about the history of Western medicine and how Berlin Dispensary evolved from a clinic to become a manufacturer and distributor of medicines in the 1950s, today trading as Berlin Pharmaceutical Industry Co Ltd.
