= Bee Taechaubol =

Thai businessman

- Born: 12 September 1975 (age 49); Thailand
- Education: Newington College; University of New South Wales; Chulalongkorn University
- Occupation: Businessman
- Spouse: Susie
- Children: 2

Bee Taechaubol (born 12 September 1975) is a Thai businessman and founder of Thai Prime Company Limited. He specializes in private equity investment in public companies, personally overseeing the turn around and growth of the businesses he is involved in.

== Education ==
Taechaubol spent his high school years in Sydney, Australia, where he attended Newington College (1987–1992). He has a degree in Civil Engineering from the University of New South Wales (1998) and an MBA from Chulalongkorn University (2000).

== Business interests ==
Thai Prime Company Limited is a South-East Asian based Private Equity group, founded by Taechaubol. Thai Prime has interests in a number of sectors, including financial services, construction, property, technology, parking, traffic infrastructure, sports and payment gateways. These interests are primarily South-East Asian centric, but extend across Asia, China and into Australia. Thai Prime operates by acquiring, holding and developing assets over the longer-term. Current holdings include K-Tech Construction Public Company Limited, Electronics Industry Public Company Limited, Country Group Development Public Company Limited, Smart Traffic Company Limited and Asia Park Company Limited. Thai Prime is also acquiring a land bank in Central Bangkok that will soon be under development across a number of real estate segments.

Taechaubol family controls Country Group, a leading property development company in Thailand for over 30 years.

== Football ==
In 2014, Taechaubol acquired the exclusive rights as sole organizer across Asia for the Global Legends Series, a four-game series bringing together legendary football players from around the world. These players play against each other in a Legends vs. Legends four-match series in different cities across the world. Players include Fabio Cannavaro, Michael Owen, Luís Figo, Cafu and Ronaldo amongst others. The Global Legends Series inaugural match took place on 5 December 2014 in Bangkok, Thailand. Launched with a ceremony to honour his Majesty King Bhumibhol Adulyadej’s 87th birthday, the event was broadcast across the globe to more than 200 million viewers. In unison with Global Legends Series, legacy and youth programs are delivered to the countries played in, with long-term programs running in countries such as China, partnering with the country’s Ministry of Education to deliver football to 200 million children over eight years old.

On June 5, 2015, it was announced that Bee Taechaubol will purchase a 48% stake in Italian football club A.C. Milan, pending further negotiations that are expected to take up to eight weeks for approval. However, the deal collapsed after Silvio Berlusconi decided to sell 100% of the club to Li Yonghong.

== Personal life ==
Taechaubol is married and has two children. He spends most of his time in Bangkok, Thailand, where his holding company Thai Prime is based. Besides his professional career, he is also the Global Ambassador for The Nourafchan Foundation, the world’s first participatory, open-source philanthropy whose mission is to improve the human condition. Recent projects include several infrastructure and education projects for orphans and those impoverished in Kenya’s largest slum, Kibera.

Bee Taechaubol is the son of Sadawut Taechaubol.
