= Sin Poh =

Sin Poh may refer to:

- Sin Pin Jit Poh, a defunct Malaysian newspaper; Guang Ming Daily claimed as a successor
- Sin Chew Jit Poh, a Malaysian newspaper that still publishing as Sin Chew Daily
- Sin Chew Jit Poh (Singapore), a defunct Singapore newspaper; was the parent company of Malaysian edition
- Sing Tao Holdings, publisher of Sing Tao Daily until 2001, a successor of "Sin Poh Amalgamated (Hong Kong)"
- Sin Poh (Star News) Amalgamated

== See also ==
- Sing Pao (disambiguation)
