= Star News Asia =

- Created by: STAR TV
- Country of origin: Hong Kong
- Original languages: English (15 December 1991-28 February 2009); Chinese (21 October 1991-30 March 1996)

Production
- Production locations: Studio D8, STAR News Department; 13/F One Harbourfront; 18 Tak Fung Street; Area of Hung Hom; Kowloon City District; Kowloon; Kowloon Peninsula, Hong Kong
- Running time: 1 hour
- Production company: STAR TV

Original release
- Network: STAR Plus (15 December 1991-30 March 1996); STAR World (31 March 1996-28 February 2009); STAR Chinese Channel (21 October 1991-30 March 1996)
- Release: 21 October 1991 – 28 December 2007

Star News Asia was the flagship daily evening television news programmes from Hong Kong, broadcast on STAR World (formerly known as STAR Plus) and STAR Chinese Channel

== Timeslots ==
=== Chinese ===
- 21 October 1991 – 30 March 1996:
  - 19:00-20:00 HKT.

=== English ===
- 15 December 1991 – 30 March 1996:
  - 20:00-21:00 HKT.
- 31 March 1996 – 28 December 2007:
  - 19:00-20:00 HKT.
