= Sing Sian Yer Pao =

Sing Sian Yer Pao Daily News

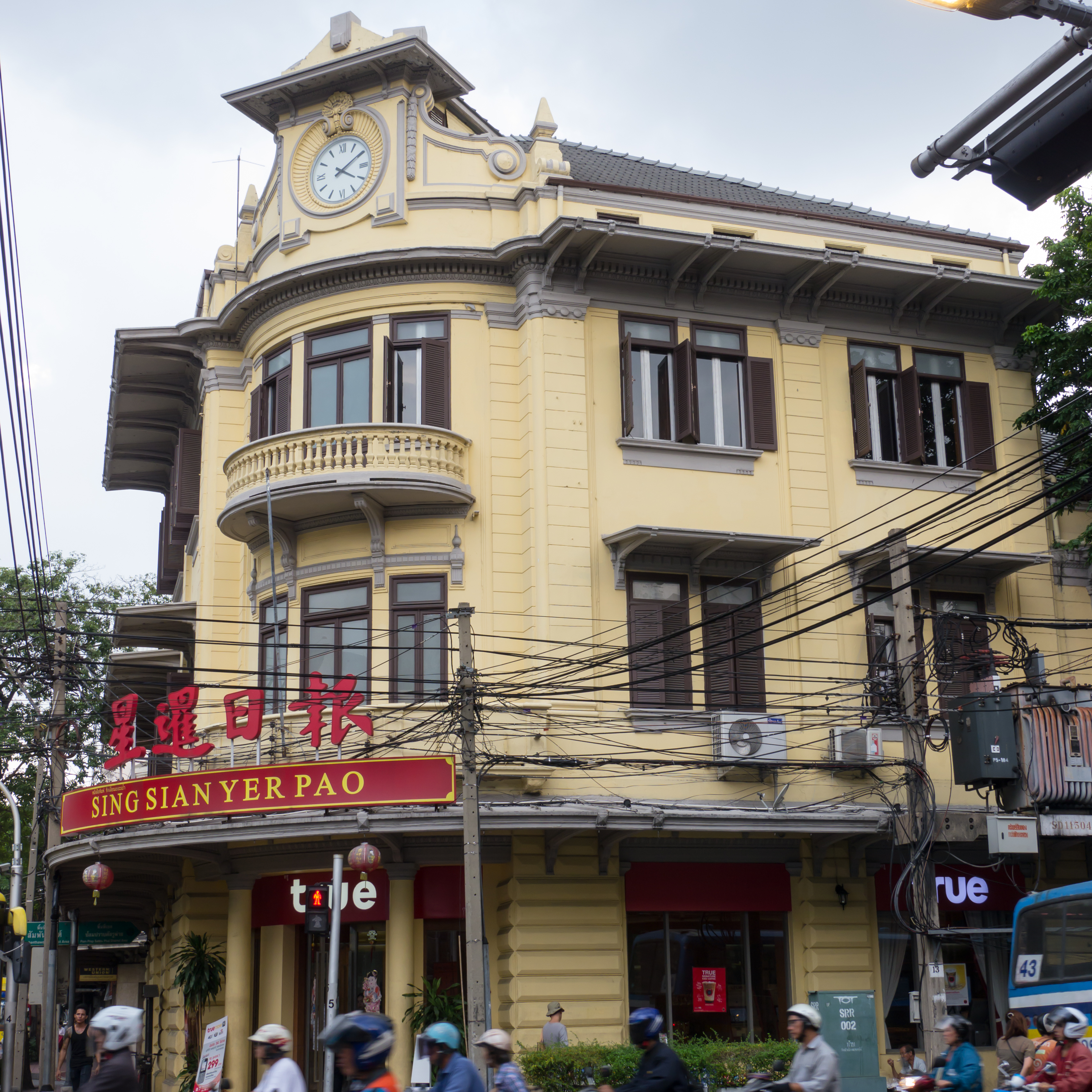
- The S.A.B. Building, headquarters of Sing Sian Yer Pao
- Native name: 星暹日报
- Type: daily newspaper
- Format: Print, online
- Owner: Sadawut Taechaubol
- Founder: Aw Boon Haw
- Publisher: Sing Sian Yer Pao Co., Ltd.; Nanfang Media Group
- President: Tommy Taechaubol
- Founded: 23 June 1950
- Language: Chinese
- City: Bangkok
- Country: Thailand
- Circulation: 600,000 (as of 1998)
- Sister newspapers: Sing Thai Wan Pao; Sing Tao Daily; Sin Chew Jit Poh; Sin Pin Jit Poh; Other publications; Nanfang Daily; Southern Metropolis Daily
- OCLC number: 68443903
- Website: singsiandailynews.com

Sing Sian Yer Pao
- Traditional Chinese: 星暹日報
- Simplified Chinese: 星暹日报
- Literal meaning: Star Siam Daily News
Transcriptions
Standard Mandarin
- Hanyu Pinyin: Xīng xiān rì bào
Yue: Cantonese
- Jyutping: sing^{1} cim^{1} jat^{6} bou^{3}

Sing Sian Yer Pao Daily News (Chinese: 星暹日报, Thai: ซิงเสียนเยอะเป้า) formerly Sing Sian Yer Pao (Note: also romanized as Sing Sian Yit Pao, Sing Sian Re Pao, Sing Sian Ye Pao or Sin Siam Jit Poh which depends on romanization system and dialect of Chinese language, which refer to the same Chinese proper name that consists of 4 Chinese characters; romanization using standard pinyin would be Xing Xian Ri Bao. Nevertheless Sing Sian Yer Pao was used as the proper name in its headquarters) is a Thai newspaper that is published in Chinese language. During its peak Sing Sian Yer Pao sold 140,000 copies a day and was known as the "Chinese Thairath". It was founded by millionaire Aw Boon Haw, a Chinese Hakka diaspora, as a sister newspaper of the "Star Newspapers" in Singapore, Malaysia and Hong Kong as well as other locations. However, by ownership, they are currently not related; sister newspapers of Sing Sian Yer Pao currently is the publication by Nanfang Media Group of the People's Republic of China.

The publisher of Sing Sian Yer Pao also published Sing Thai Wan Pao (Chinese: 星泰晚报; lit. 'Star Thai Evening News') in the past.

== History ==
Sing Sian Yer Pao was first published in 1950 by Eng Aun Publishing Co., Ltd. (Eng Aun is the first two words of Eng Aun Tong). Since its foundation, it was owned by Aw Boon-haw and his daughter Aw Cheng-sin (Suri Santiongchai) until recent years.

From 1971 until 2005, the chairman of the publisher of the newspaper was Lee Aik-sim (Lee A. Santipongchai, Chinese: 李益森), husband of Aw Cheng-sin (Chinese: 胡清心 or Suri Santipongchai), the daughter of late Aw Boon-par; Boon-par was the young brother of Boon Haw. Likes other business founded by Aw Boon-haw, the key positions were filled by his blood relatives and sons-in-law, which previously one of the key position was held by 胡夢洲 in 1950s to 1960s (as general manager), (Note: 胡夢洲 also worked for Sing Ming Jih Pao in Fuzhou. "Ming" is the short form of Fujian Province. Sing Ming Jih Pao was closed down circa 1949–50.) who is from Aw Boon-haw's ancestral home Yongding. In the 1960s, the chairman of the publisher was Aw Kow, son of Boon-haw and cousin of Cheng-sin, while the editor-in-chief in the 1960s was Jimmy Wu (Chinese: 吳占美), who also served sister newspaper Sing Tao Daily in 1951. It was reported that he served as the editor-in-chief in Sing Tao before his arrival to Thailand.

Lee Aik-sim (Lee A Santipongchai) and Aw Cheng-sin (Suri Santipongchai) were also the directors of the Thai subsidiary of Haw Par Brothers International, a listed company in; They resigned in January 1972, after the family controlled listed company was takeover in June 1971. Also due to the new laws in Singapore and Malaysia regarding media ownership, the Thai edition of the "Star Newspapers", were parted away with its Singapore and Malaysia counterpart, as the latter were no longer owned by Aw family; the Hong Kong editions, such as Sing Tao Daily, was owned by Sally Aw, daughter of Aw Boon-haw since 1954, which have a bitter relationship with her Singapore-based family.

According to a periodical, in 1997 the publisher of Sing Sian Yer Pao was known as Sing Pao Limited, with Lee Aik-sim (Lee A Santipongchai) and his wife were the principal shareholders. In 2005, the managing director of the publisher was their daughter (Chinese: 李坤珊).

Sing Sian Yer Pao, under Lee's management was influential in politics and trade in the Chinese circles in Thailand. By not choosing political sides between Mainland China or Taiwan Dictatorship, Sing Sian's printing house published many Thai newspapers in that era.

In 2010 Sadawut Taechaubol (Note: Sadawut Taechaubol is a Thai with Chinese diaspora. He also known as 郑芷荪. He is father of Bee Taechaubol according to news report. Sadawut Taechaubol was the vice-chairman of Thai listed company Country Group Development and chairman of Country Group Holdings) acquired the publisher from the hands of the Chinese magnate Lee Santipongchai. The newspaper changed to use simplified Chinese characters to publish, in order to response to drop in the number of readers. According to managing director and executive editor Tommy Tan in an interview, the newspaper now targets Chinese tourists and investors who are visiting Thailand.

In 2013 a partnership agreement was signed with Chinese media conglomerate Nanfang Media Group (Chinese: 南方报业传媒集团) to publish the newspaper.
