= List of neighbourhoods in Bangkok =

Ayutthaya

This is a partial list of neighbourhoods in Bangkok.

== Bang Kapi ==
- Bang Kapi
- Chok Chai 4
- Happy Land
- Hua Mak
- Khlong Chan
- Lam Sali
- Lat Phrao
- Liab Duan Ramnintra
- Lo Lae
- Ramkhamhaeng

== Bang Sue ==
- Bang Pho
- Bang Son
- Bang Sue
- Pracha Chuen
- Tao Pun
- Wong Sawang

== Chatuchak ==
- Ari
- Chatuchak Park
- Chorakhe Bua
- Bang Sue
- Kaset–Nawamin
- Lat Phrao
- Mo Chit
- Phahon Yothin
- Pradiphat
- Ratchayothin
- Saphan Khwai
- Sanam Pao
- Sutthisan
- Wat Samian Nari

== Don Mueang ==
- Bang Khen
- Don Mueang
- Kaset-Nawamin
- Lak Si
- Lat Pla Khao
- Ngam Wong Wan
- Saphan Mai
- Sena Nikhom
- Thung Song Hong

== Dusit ==
- Bang Krabue
- Kiak Kai
- Maha Nak
- Ratchawat
- Samsen
- Si Yan
- Soi Suan Oi

== Pathum Wan (well known as Ratchaprasong shopping street area) ==
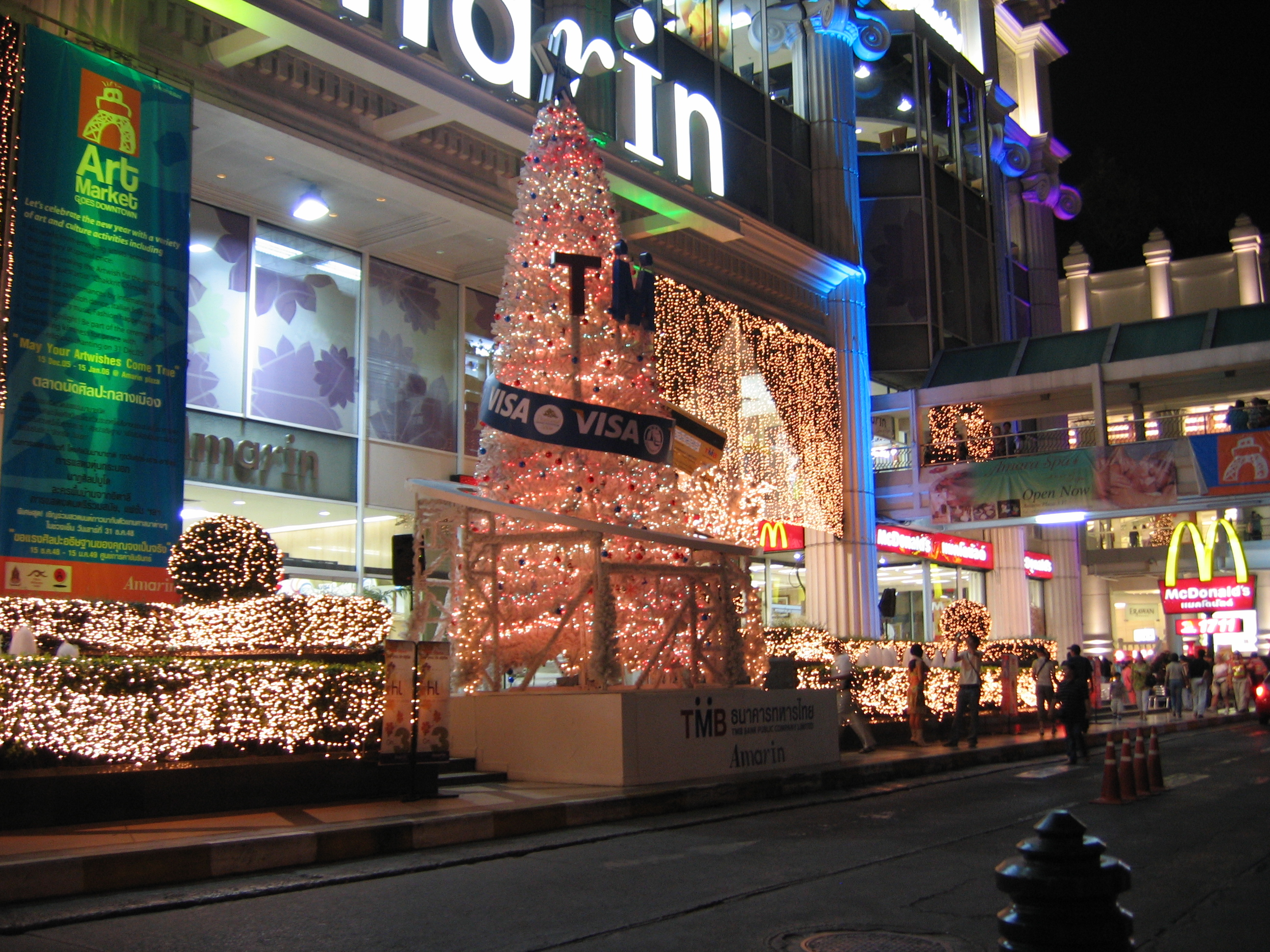
Lights in front of Amarin Plaza at Ratchaprasong

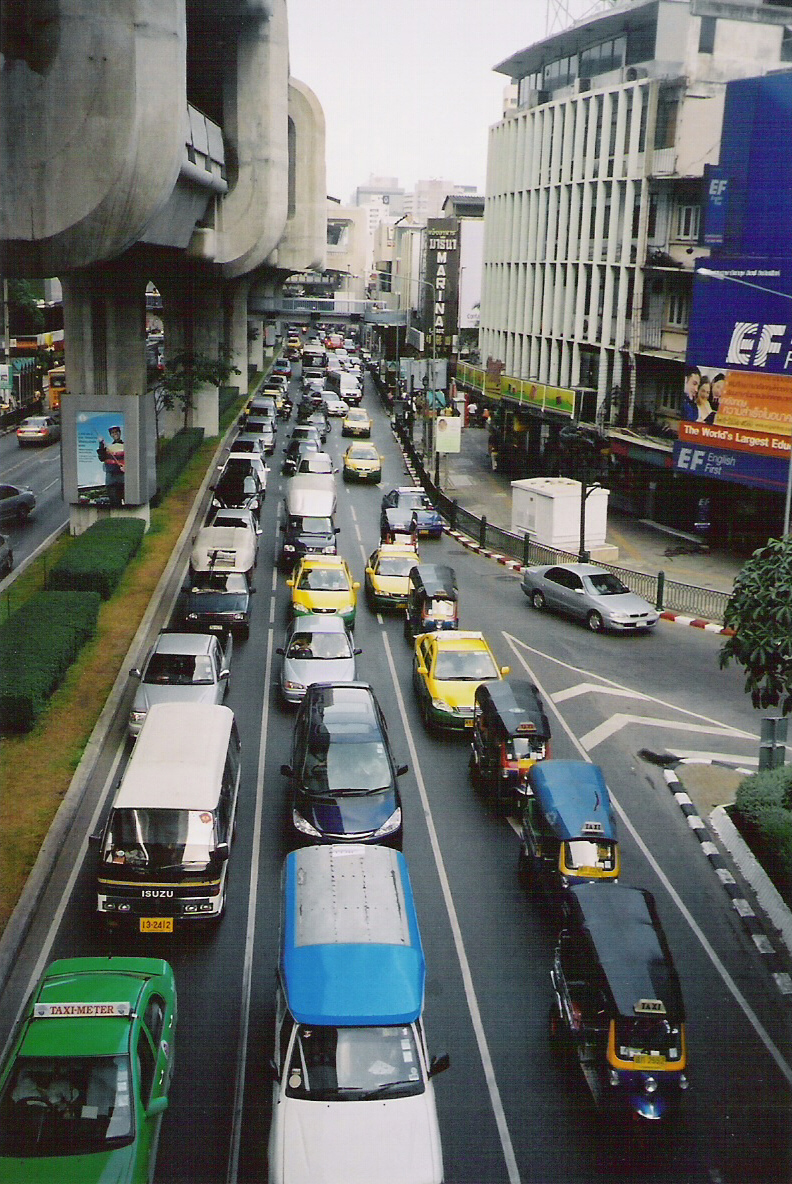
Traffic jam at Siam Square

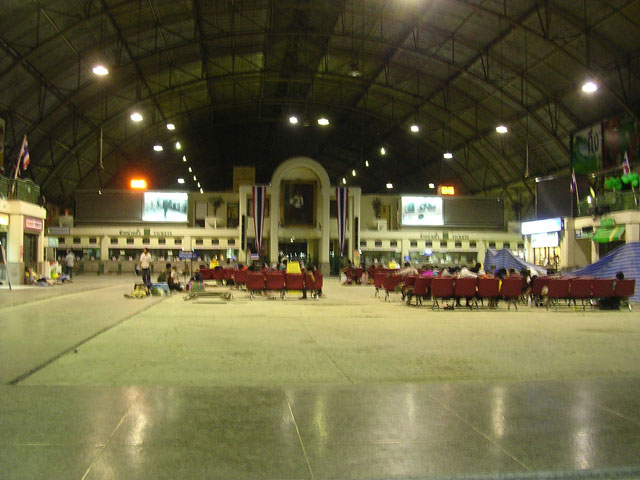
Inside Hua Lamphong (main railway station in Bangkok)

- Ban Krua
- Banthat Thong
- Bon Kai
- Charoen Phon
- Chit Lom
- Chula
- Hua Lamphong
- Lang Suan
- Suphachalasai (National Stadium)
- Phloen Chit
- Phra Ram 1
- Ratchadamri
- Ratchaprasong
- Sam Yan
- Saphan Lueang
- Siam Square (Shinjuku of Thailand)
- Suan Luang
- Suan Lum
- Witthayu

== Phetchaburi ==
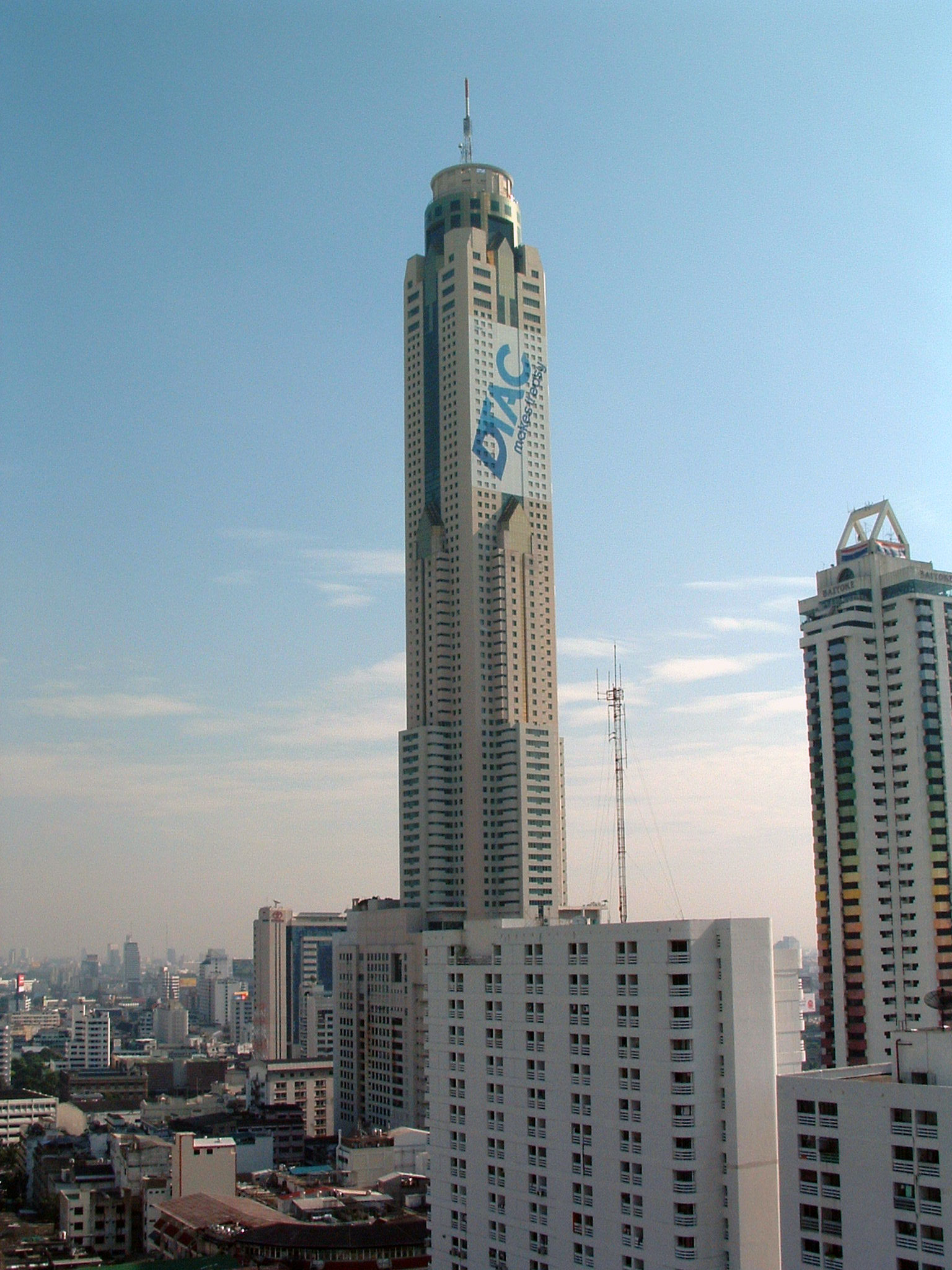
Baiyoke Tower 2 at Pratu Nam (second tallest building in Bangkok)

- Indra
- Khlong Tan
- Makkasan
- Pantip Plaza
- Phet Rama
- Pratu Nam
- Ratchaprarop
- Yommarat
- Uruphong

== Phra Nakhon (well known as Rattanakosin Island) ==
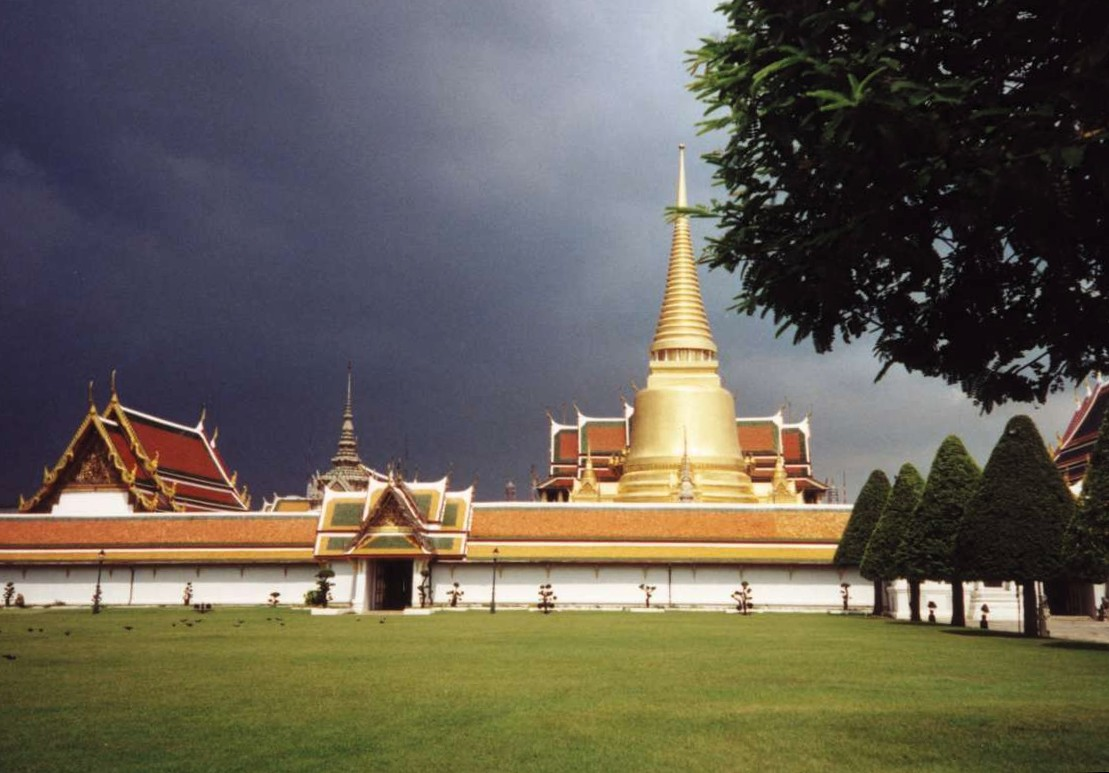
The Wat Phra Kaew temple at Sanam Luang

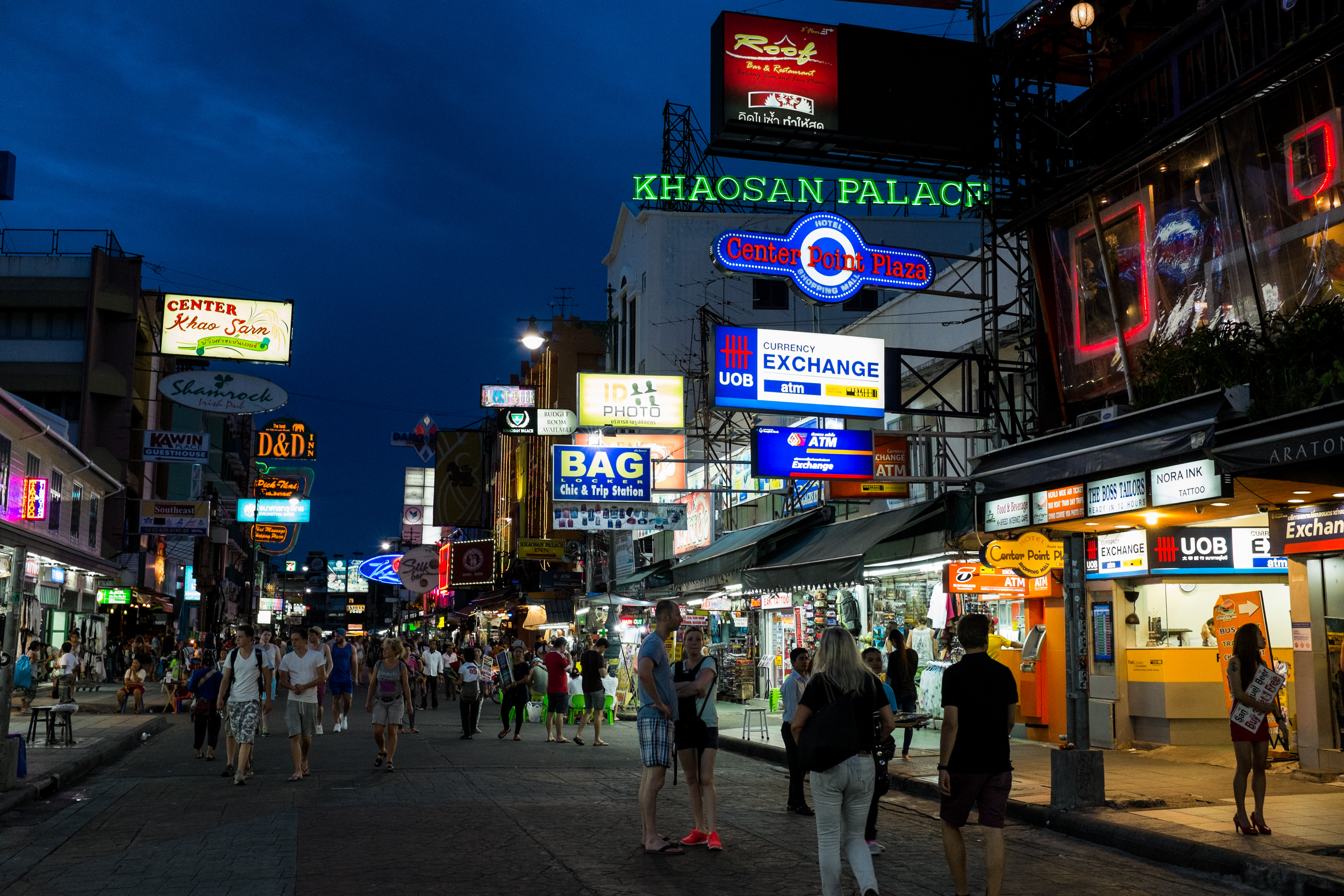
Khaosan Road at night

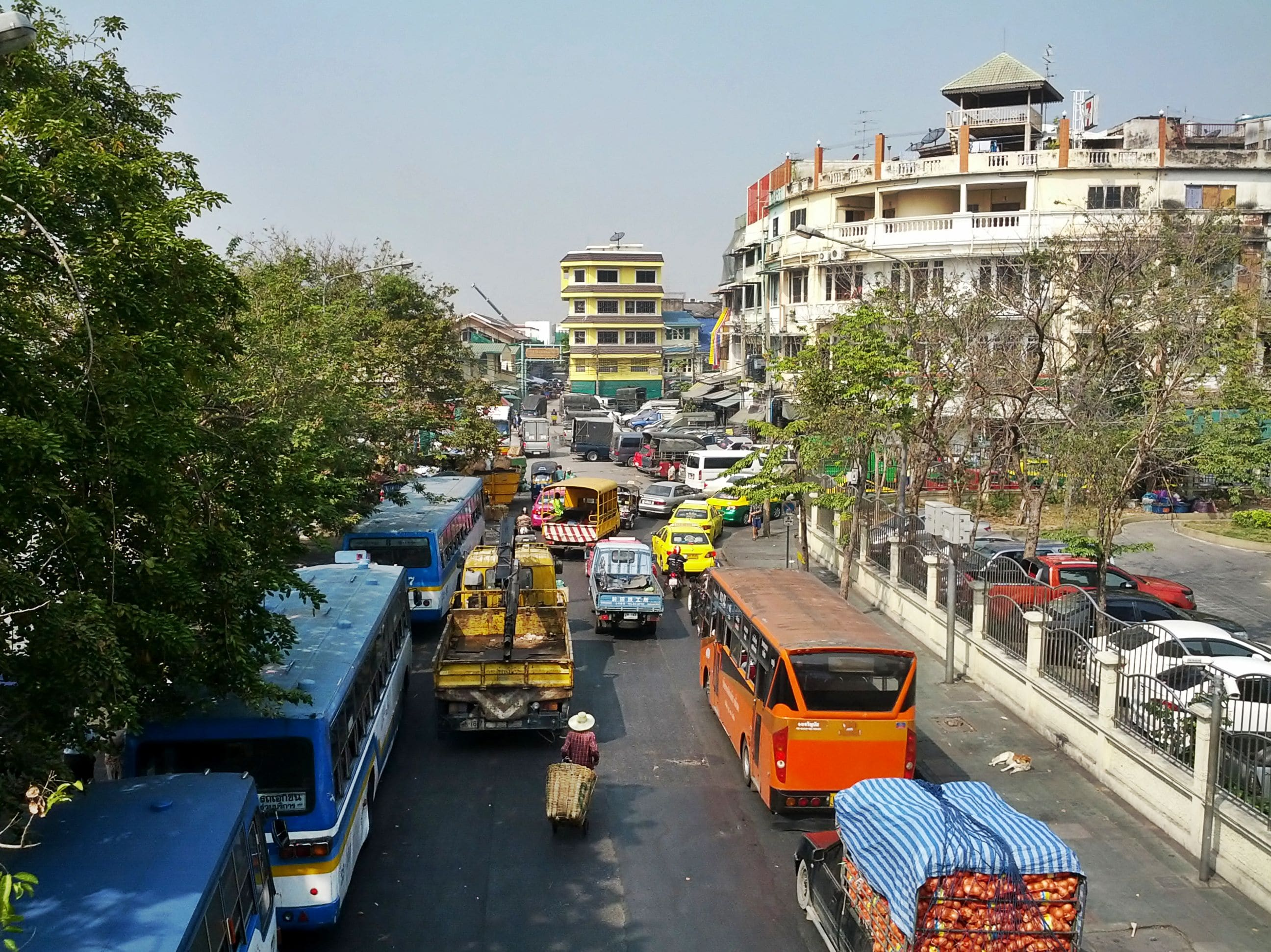
Under Saphan Phut at day

- Ban Mo
- Bang Lamphu
- Trok Khaosan
- Khlong Lot
- Khok Wua
- Pak Khlong Talat
- Pratu Phi
- Ratchadamnoen
- Saphan Phut (Memorial Bridge)
- Sam Phraeng
- Sanam Luang
- Sao Chingcha
- Si Kak
- Tha Phra Chan
- Tha Tian
- Thewet

== Pom Prap Sattru Phai ==
- Ban Bat
- Bobae
- Lan Luang
- Maen Si
- Nang Loeng
- Saphan Khao
- Suan Mali
- Suea Pa
- Wong Wian Yi Sip Song Karakada Khom
- Worachak
- Yotse

== Ratchadaphisek or Ratchada ==
- Chan Kasem
- Din Daeng
- Huai Khwang
- Meng Jai
- Phra Ram 9
- Pracha Songkhro
- Sutthisan (Inthamara)
- RCA
- Thailand Cultural Centre
- Town in Town

== Sathon ==
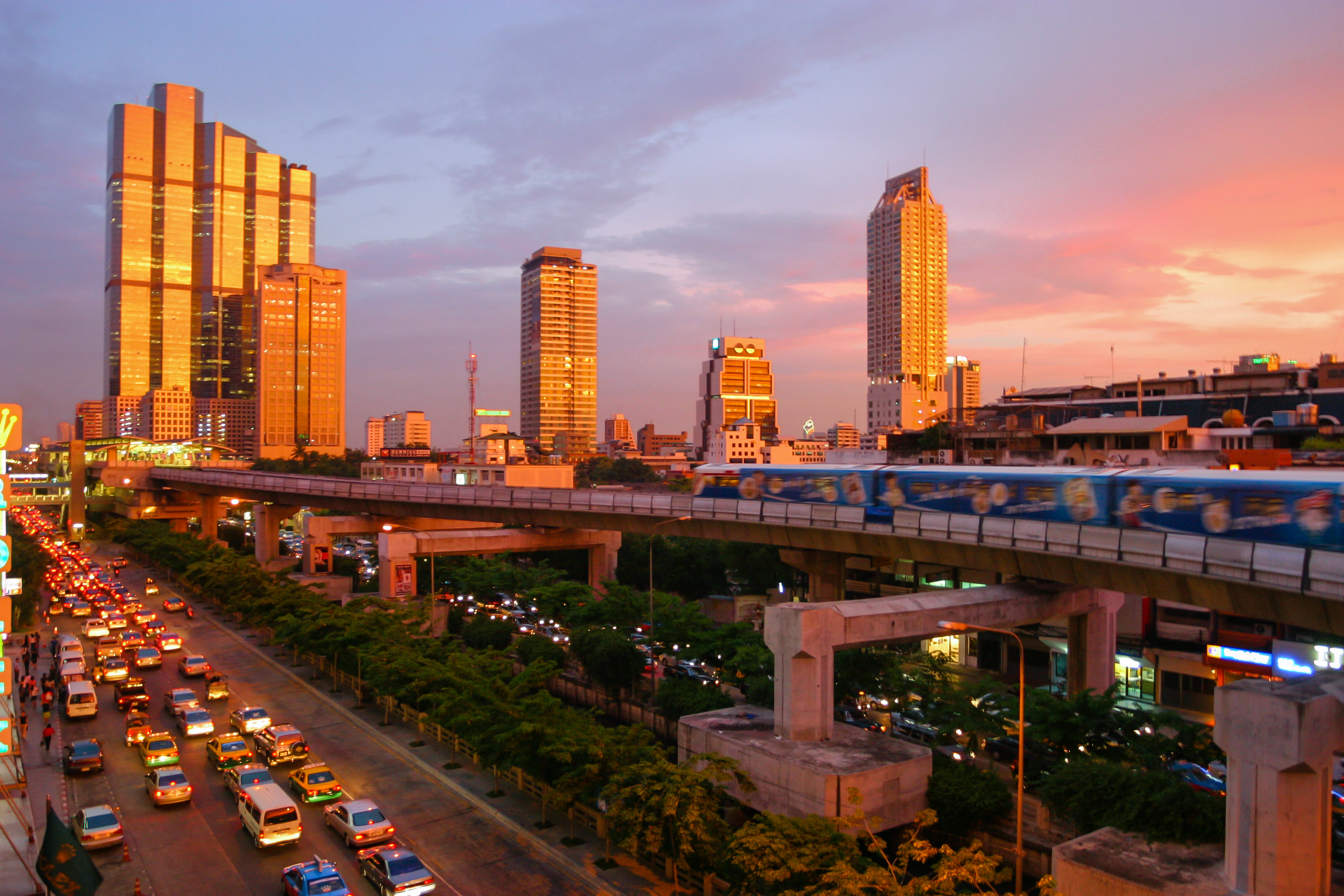
Naradhiwas Rajanagarindra

- Chong Nonsi
- Lumphini
- Naradhiwas Rajanagarindra
- Phra Ram 3
- Saphan Taksin
- Sathu Pradit
- Surasak
- Thanon Chan
- Thanon Tok
- Yan Nawa

== Si Lom ==
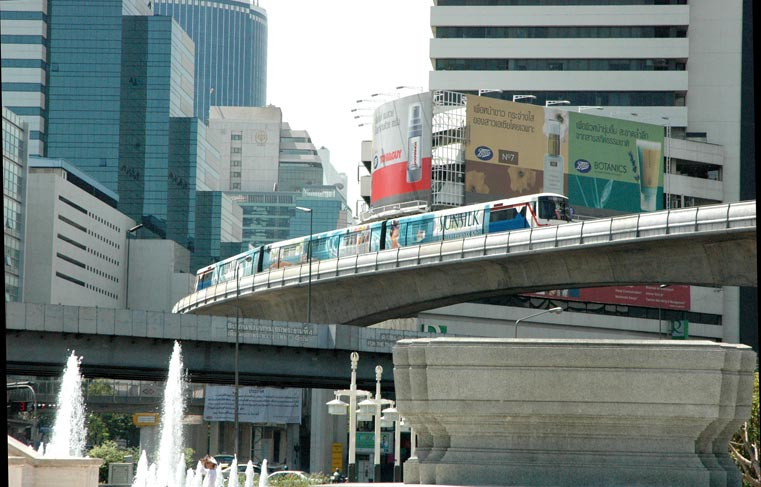
BTS Sala Daeng Station at Si Lom

- Bang Rak
- Patpong
- Sala Daeng
- Silom
- Si Phraya
- Soi Lalai Sap
- Surawong
- Thaniya

== Sri Nakarin ==
- Bang Na
- Bearing
- BITEC (Bangkok International Trade & Exhibition Centre)
- Krungthep Kritha
- Lasalle
- Nong Bon
- Phatthanakan
- Suan Luang
- Wat Si Iam

== Sukhumvit ==
- Asok
- Ekkamai
- Khlong Toei
- Kluai Nam Thai
- Nana
- On Nut
- Phra Khanong
- Phra Ram 4
- Phrom Phong
- Queen Sirikit Center
- Thong Lo
- Udom Suk

== Thon Buri ==
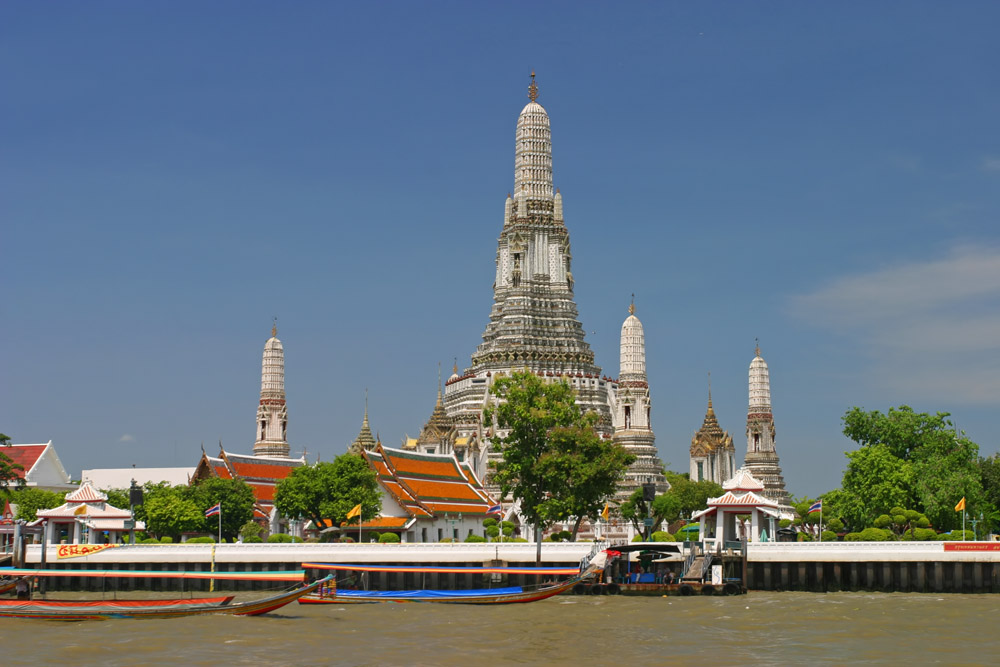
Wat Arun

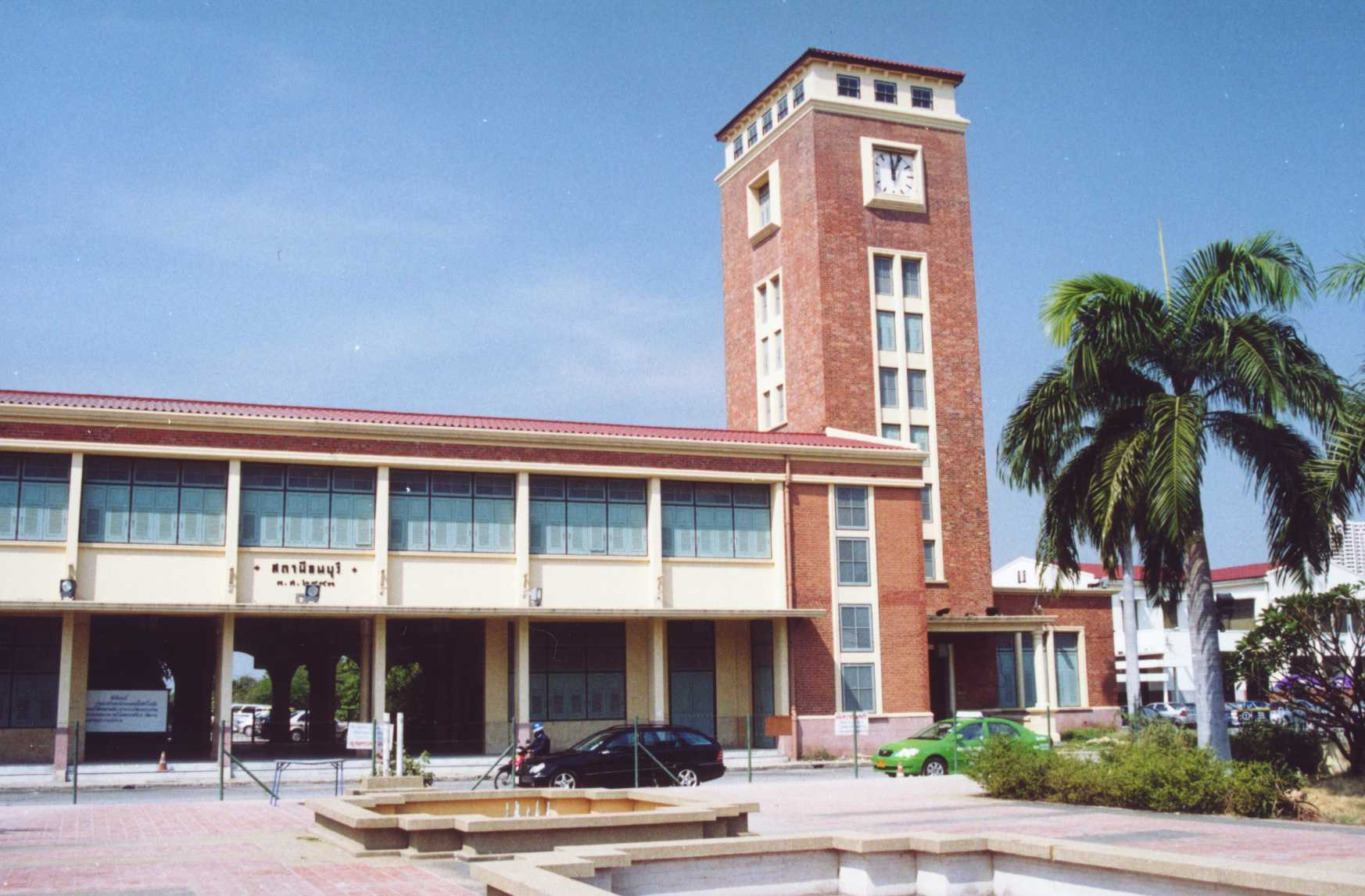
Thonburi railway station at Siriraj

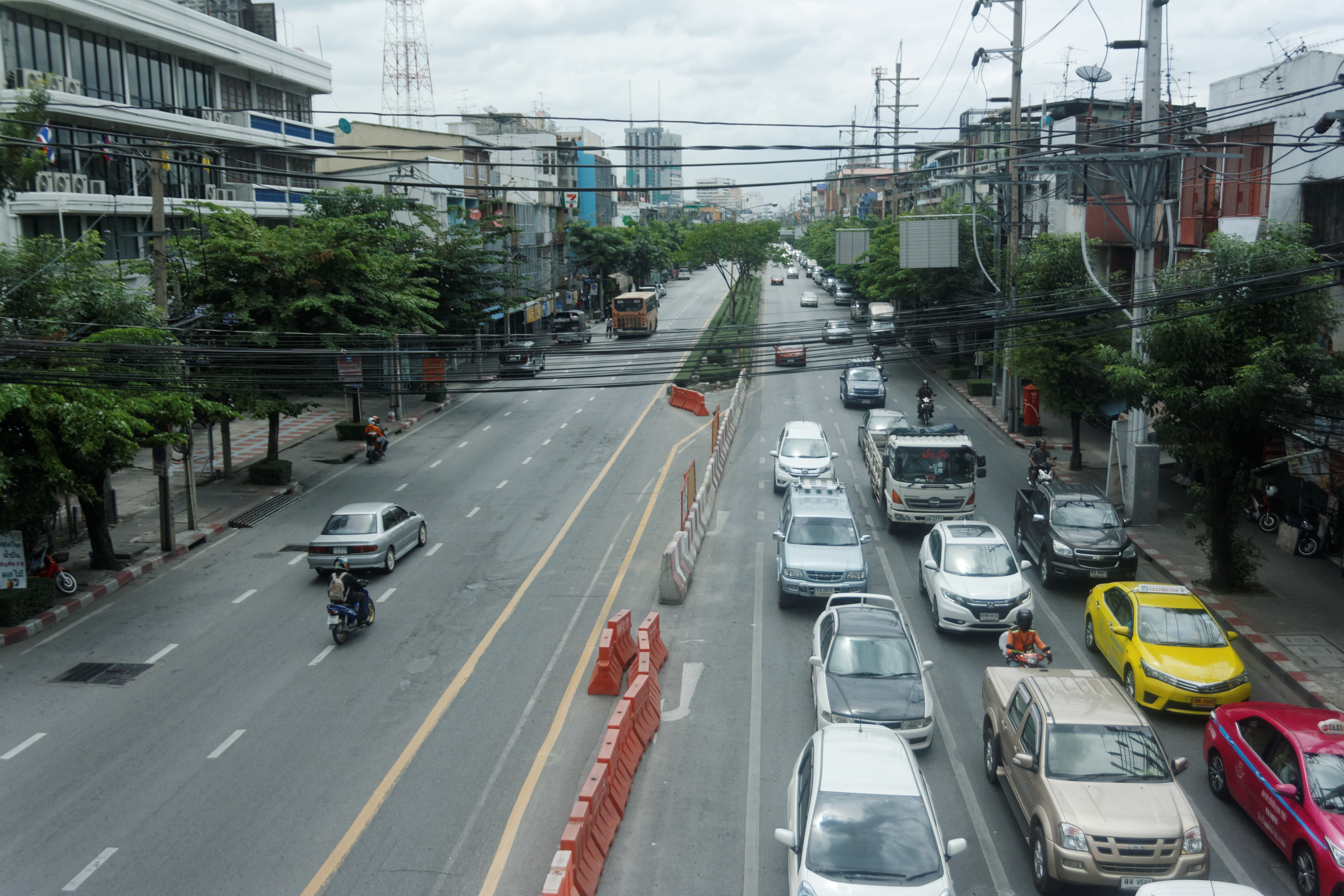
Phran Nok

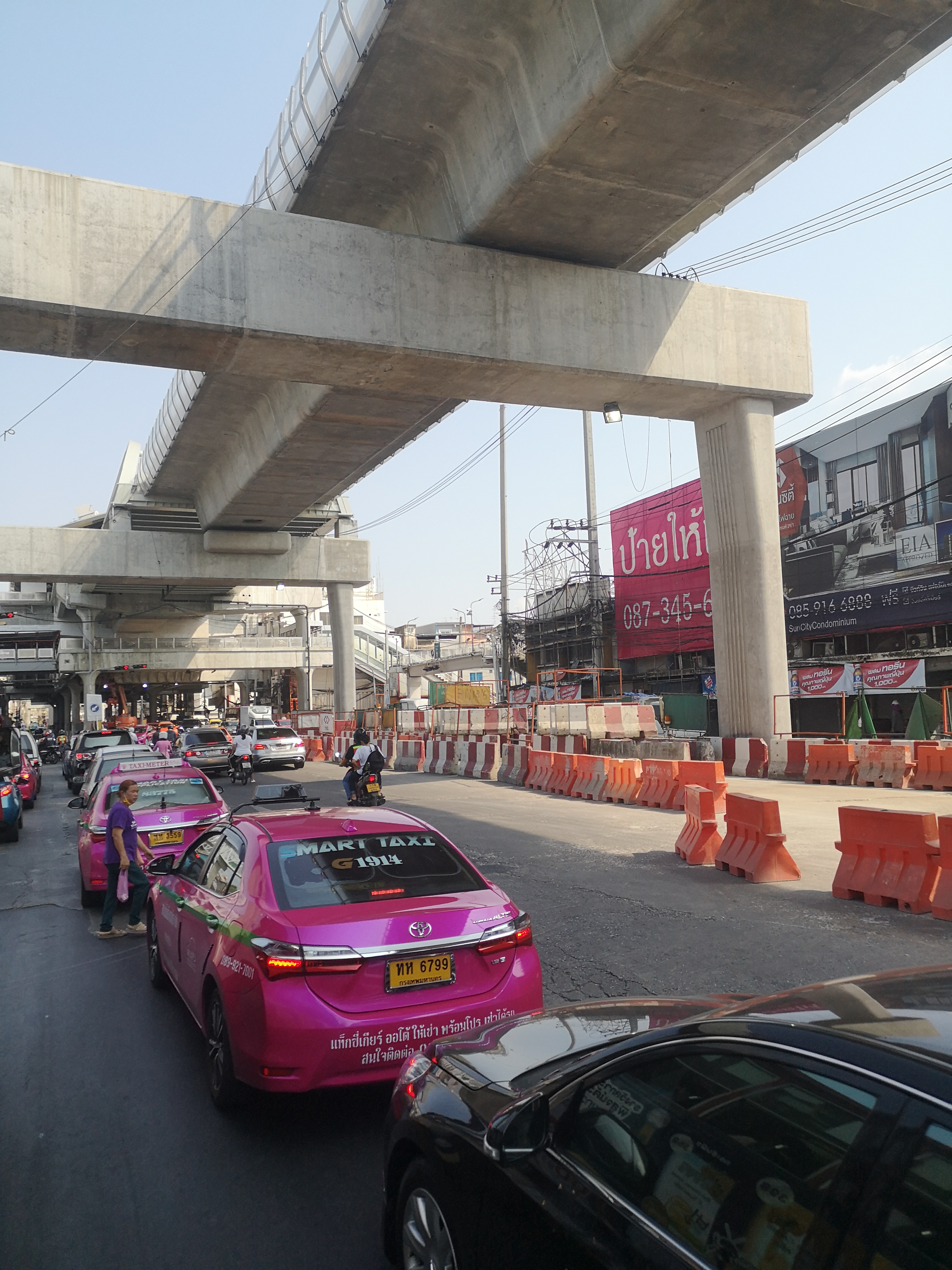
Charan Sanit Wong near Fai Chai Junction

- Ban Khaek
- Ban Khamin
- Bang Kradi
- Ban Noen
- Bang Bon
- Bang Khae
- Bang Khun Non
- Bang Khun Thian
- Bang Mot
- Bang O
- Bang Pakaeo
- Bang Pakok
- Bang Phai
- Bang Wa
- Bukkhalo
- Charan Sanit Wong
- Charoen Nakhon
- Charoenphat
- Charoen Rat
- Dao Khanong
- Faichai
- Hua Krabue
- Khlong Khwang
- Khlong San
- Kudi Chin
- Lak Song
- Nong Khaem
- Pho Sam Ton
- Phran Nok
- Phra Ram 2
- Pinklao
- Phuttha Bucha
- Phutthamonthon
- Rat Burana
- Ratchaphruek
- Samre
- Sanam Luang 2
- Siri Rat
- Talat Phlu
- Taling Chan
- Tha Din Daeng
- Tha Phra
- Thung Khru
- Wat Arun
- Wang Lang
- Wong Wian Lek
- Wong Wian Yai

== Victory Monument ==
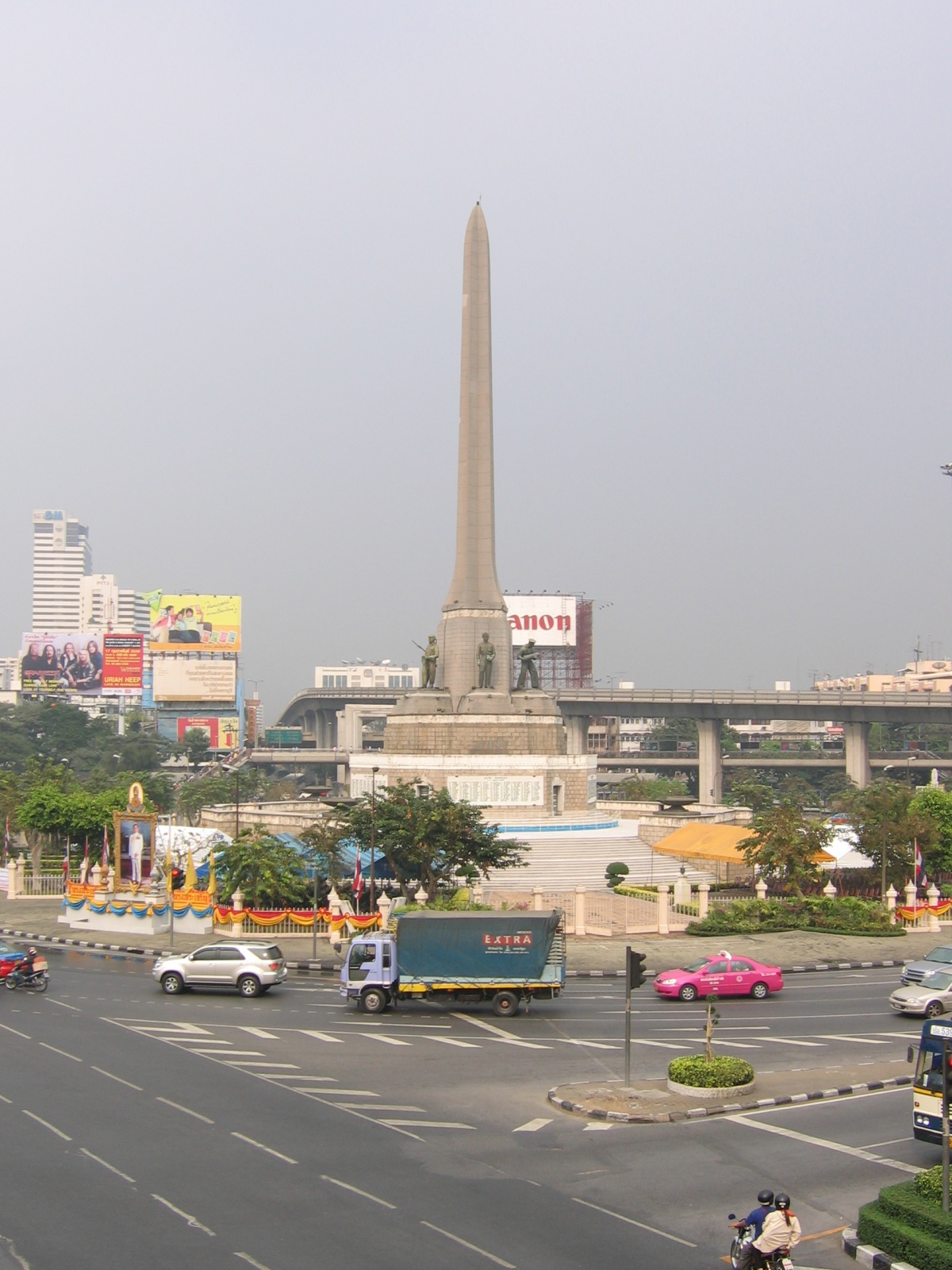
Victory Monument

- Mo Leng
- Phaya Thai
- Ratchathewi
- Ratchawithi
- Sam Liam Din Daeng
- Sanam Pao

== Wang Burapha ==
- Khlong Thom
- Phahurat (Little India of Bangkok)
- Sam Yot
- Saphan Lek
- Wang Burapha
- Woeng Nakhon Kasem (Thieves' Market)

== Yaowarat (Chinatown of Bangkok) ==
- Phlapphla Chai
- Ratchawong
- Sampheng
- Song Wat
- Sam Yaek
- Saphan Han
- Sieng Kong
- Soi Nana (Chinatown)
- Talat Noi
- Yaowarat

== See also ==
- Bangkok
- Bangkok MRT
- Bangkok Mass Transit System (BTS)
- List of shopping malls in Thailand
- Downtown
- Central business district
- List of leading shopping streets and districts by city
