= Pirapan Salirathavibhaga =

Thai politician

Pirapan Salirathavibhaga MPCh MWM
- พีระพันธุ์ สาลีรัฐวิภาค
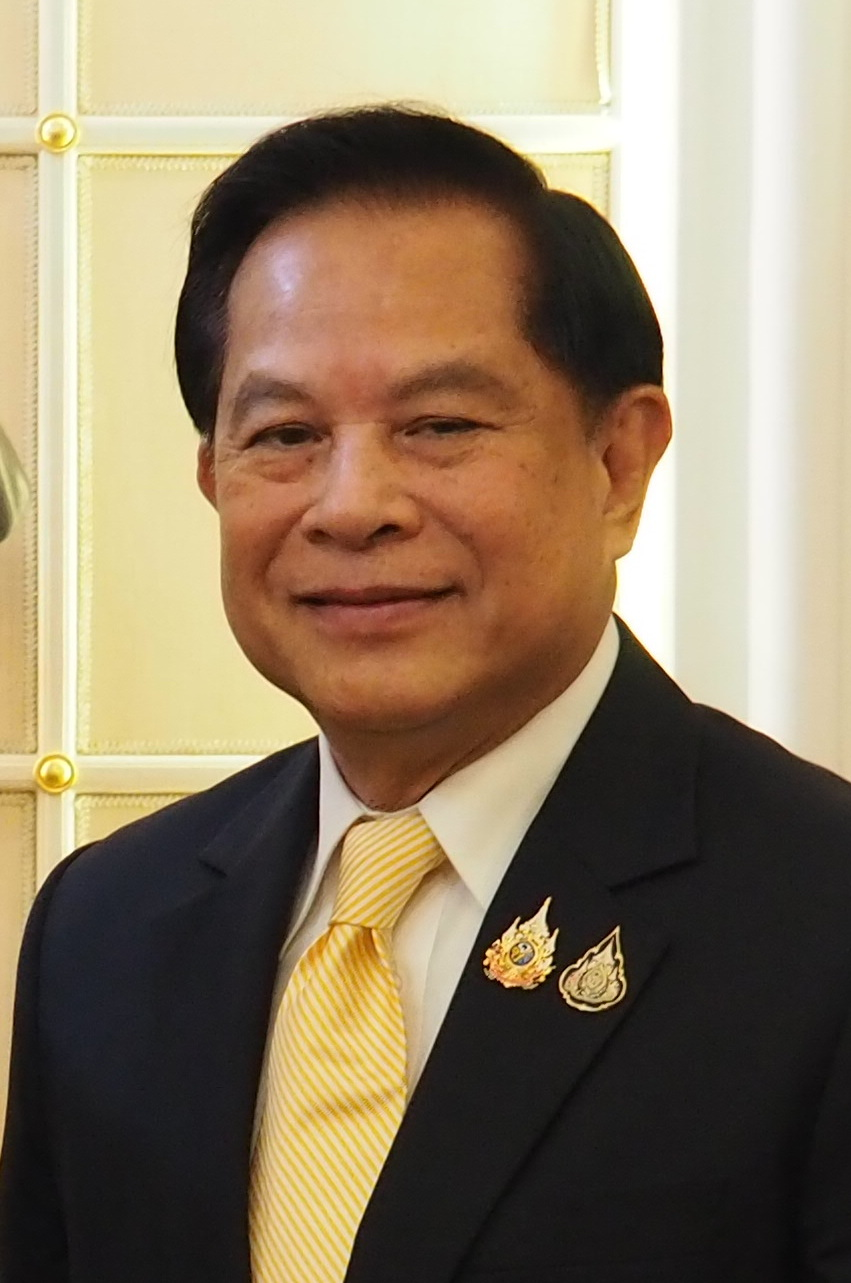

Deputy Prime Minister of Thailand
- In office 1 September 2023 – 19 September 2025
- Prime Minister: Srettha Thavisin Paetongtarn Shinawatra: Suriya Juangroongruangkit (acting) Phumtham Wechayachai (acting)

Minister of Energy
- In office 1 September 2023 – 19 September 2025
- Prime Minister: Srettha Thavisin Paetongtarn Shinawatra: Suriya Juangroongruangkit (acting) Phumtham Wechayachai (acting)
- Preceded by: Supattanapong Punmeechaow
- Succeeded by: Auttapol Rerkpiboon

Secretary-General to the Prime Minister
- In office 20 December 2022 – 1 September 2023
- Prime Minister: Prayut Chan-o-cha
- Preceded by: Distat Hotrakitya
- Succeeded by: Prommin Lertsuridej

Minister of Justice
- In office 20 December 2008 – 9 August 2011
- Prime Minister: Abhisit Vejjajiva
- Preceded by: Somsak Kiatsuranont
- Succeeded by: Pracha Promnok

Leader of the United Thai Nation Party
- Incumbent
- Assumed office 3 August 2022
- Preceded by: Thandee Hongrattanauthai (Acting)

Personal details
- Born: 21 February 1959 (age 67) Bangkok, Thailand
- Party: United Thai Nation Party (2022–present)
- Other political affiliations: Democratic Party (1996–2019); Independent (2019–2021); Palang Pracharath Party (2021–2022)
- Spouse: Sunong Salirathavibhaga
- Education: Thammasat University (LL.B.); Tulane University (LL.M., MCL)

Pirapan Salirathavibhaga (Thai: พีระพันธุ์ สาลีรัฐวิภาค, RTGS: Phiraphan Saliratthawiphak; born 21 February 1959) is a Thai politician who has served as the Minister of Energy and Deputy Prime Minister of Thailand since 2023. Salirathavibhaga is leader of the United Thai Nation Party.

== Family background ==
His ancestors — whether his father, grandfather, or even great-grandfather — were all either military officers or judges, holding high-ranking positions in government service. His family also owned multiple houses and plots of land throughout the Pradiphat, Saphan Khwai, and Sutthisan areas. A short street branching off from Pradiphat road was even named after the family’s surname: Salirathavibhaga road (or Saliratthawiphak in alternative spellings).

== Political careers ==
He began his political career as an MP representing the Phaya Thai district — an area where his family owned significant land — under the Democrat Party, alongside Abhisit Vejjajiva and Tharin Nimmanhaemin, following the general election in late 1996.

== Royal decorations ==
Pirapan has received the following royal decorations in the Honours System of Thailand:

- 1999 - Knight Grand Cordon of the Most Exalted Order of the White Elephant
- 1998 - Knight Grand Cordon of The Most Noble Order of the Crown of Thailand
