= Sutthisan Winitchai Road =

Road in Bangkok

Coordinates: 13.789332°N 100.569146°E

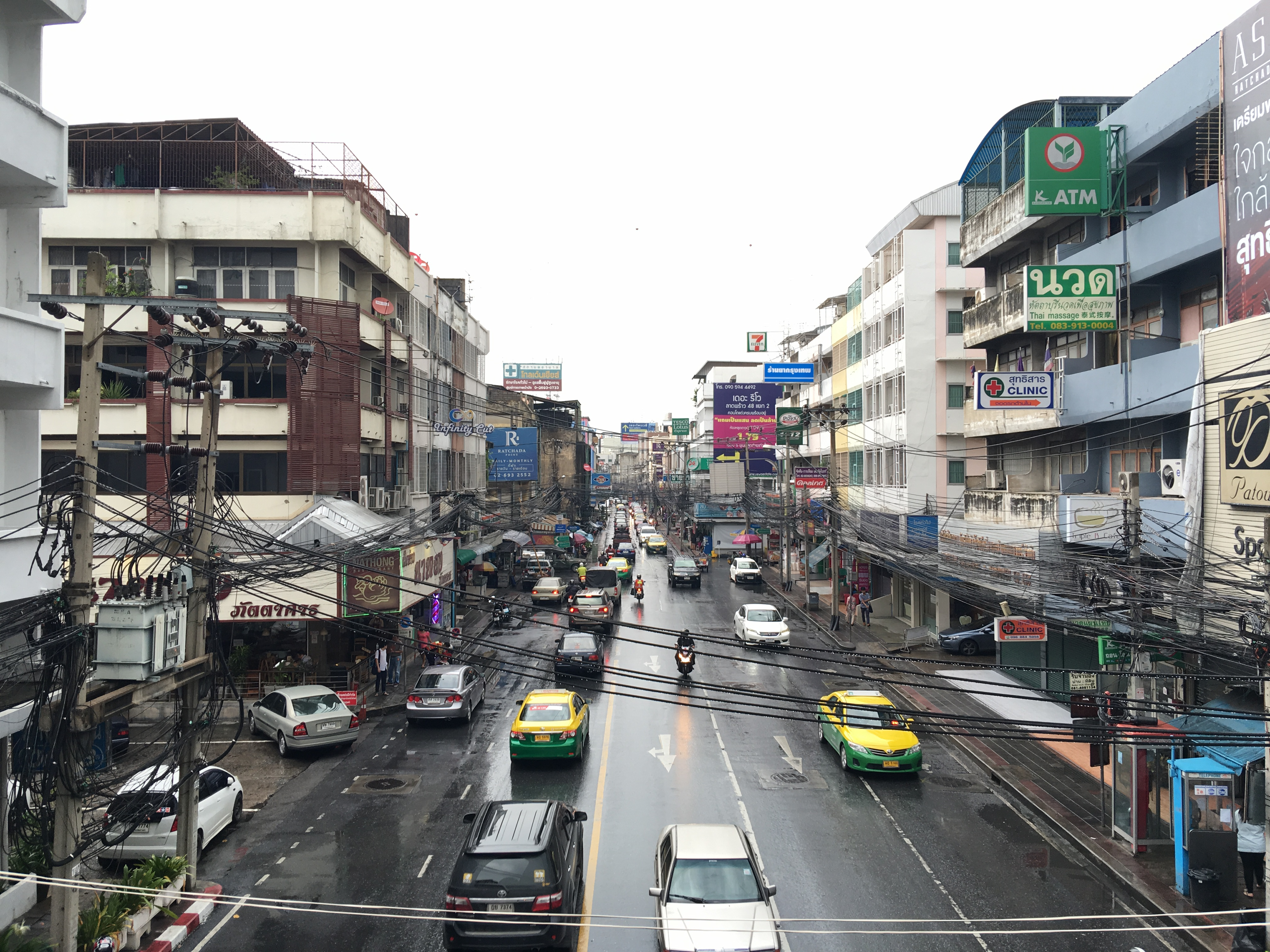
Sutthisan Winitchai Road in the area of Huai Khwang

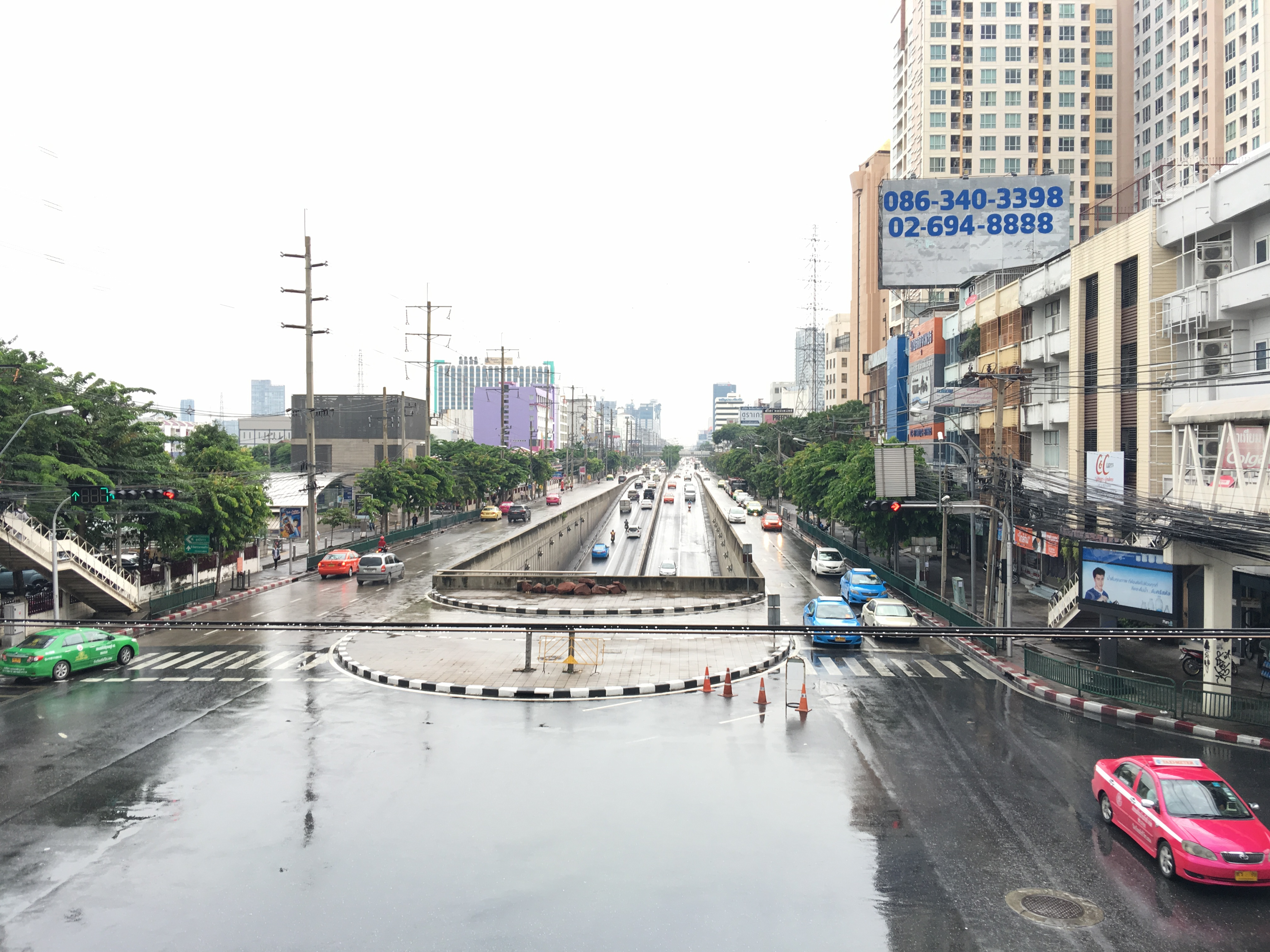
Ratchada–Sutthisan Intersection, where Sutthisan Road crosses Ratchadaphisek Road on the boundary between Huai Khwang and Din Daeng districts

Sutthisan Winitchai Road (Thai: ถนนสุทธิสารวินิจฉัย), commonly referred to as Sutthisan Road (ถนนสุทธิสาร), is a soi-style road in downtown Bangkok and also the name of the neighbourhood it runs through. It is less than 2 km (1.2 mi) away from Ari.

== History & route ==
The road was constructed in 1956. Its name, "Sutthisan Winitchai", honours Phra Sutthisan Winitchai (Mali Bunnag), a former civil servant of the Ministry of Justice, whose heir donated private land to the authorities to build the road for public use.

Sutthisan Road begins on the east side of Phahonyothin Road. It intersects with Saliratthawiphak Road (ถนนสาลีรัฐวิภาค) at the Saphan Khwai Intersection, then continues to cross Vibhavadi Rangsit Road at Sutthisan Intersection, in front of the Sutthisan Fire and Rescue Station. It then intersects Ratchadaphisek Road at the Ratchada–Sutthisan Intersection and continues until it reaches a bridge crossing the Khlong Lat Phrao canal, where it joins with Soi Lat Phrao 64 (Yaek 4 or Soi Ketnuti). The total length of the road is 4.5 km (2.8 mi).

However, after the first 500 m (1,640.4 ft), the road becomes known as Inthamara Road (ถนนอินทามระ). This section is named after Police Lieutenant General To Inthamara, a former officer who donated his own land to develop roads and residential areas for fellow police officers. Today, the name Inthamara refers to all 59 sois branching off Sutthisan Road. In 2004, the Bangkok Metropolitan Administration (BMA) officially changed the name of the entire road to Sutthisan. However, in 2017, a court ruling ordered the BMA to revert to using the name Inthamara Road, as it had been historically recognised. Despite this, the BMA maintains that Sutthisan remains more widely known among the public.

== Surrounding areas ==
Sutthisan is considered one of the older neighbourhoods in Bangkok. Historically, those who lived in nearby neighbourhoods during the 1960s recall that Sutthisan was primarily a residential area, much like Saphan Khwai or Pradiphat. However, Sutthisan was seen as less affluent in comparison, likely because of its narrow roads and the lack of large plots of land. Most homes in the area were modest, typically shophouses, or small standalone dwellings, which gave the neighbourhood a more compact and humble character.

Today, it is seen as a desirable residential area due to its convenient location, serving as a shortcut or connector to major thoroughfares such as Phahonyothin and Vibhavadi Rangsit Roads. The arrival of Saphan Khwai Station on the BTS Skytrain in 1999, followed by Sutthisan Station on the MRT Blue Line in 2004, significantly boosted the area's land value, especially along Phahonyothin Road and in the Saphan Khwai area where many condominiums have since been developed.

== See also ==
- List of neighbourhoods in Bangkok
