= Bang Krabue =

Bang Krabue (Thai: บางกระบือ) may refer to:

- Bang Krabue, Bangkok, an intersection and neighbourhood in Dusit District, Bangkok
- Bang Krabue Subdistrict, a subdistrict (tambon) in Bang Khonthi District, Samut Songkhram Province
- Bang Krabue Subdistrict, a subdistrict (tambon) in Mueang Sing Buri District, Sing Buri Province
- Bang Krabue Subdistrict, a subdistrict (tambon) in Sam Khok District, Pathum Thani Province
