= Sam Sen Nai Philatelic Museum =

Museum in Bangkok, Thailand

Coordinates: 13.7938°N 100.5489°E

Thai Philatelic Museum (Thai: พิพิธภัณฑ์ตราไปรษณียากร) is a postal museum in Phaya Thai District in Bangkok, Thailand. The Sam Sen Nai Philatelic Museum is one of three postal museums in Thailand. In 2024, the museums signed a memorandum to collaborate and develop their collections to international standards.

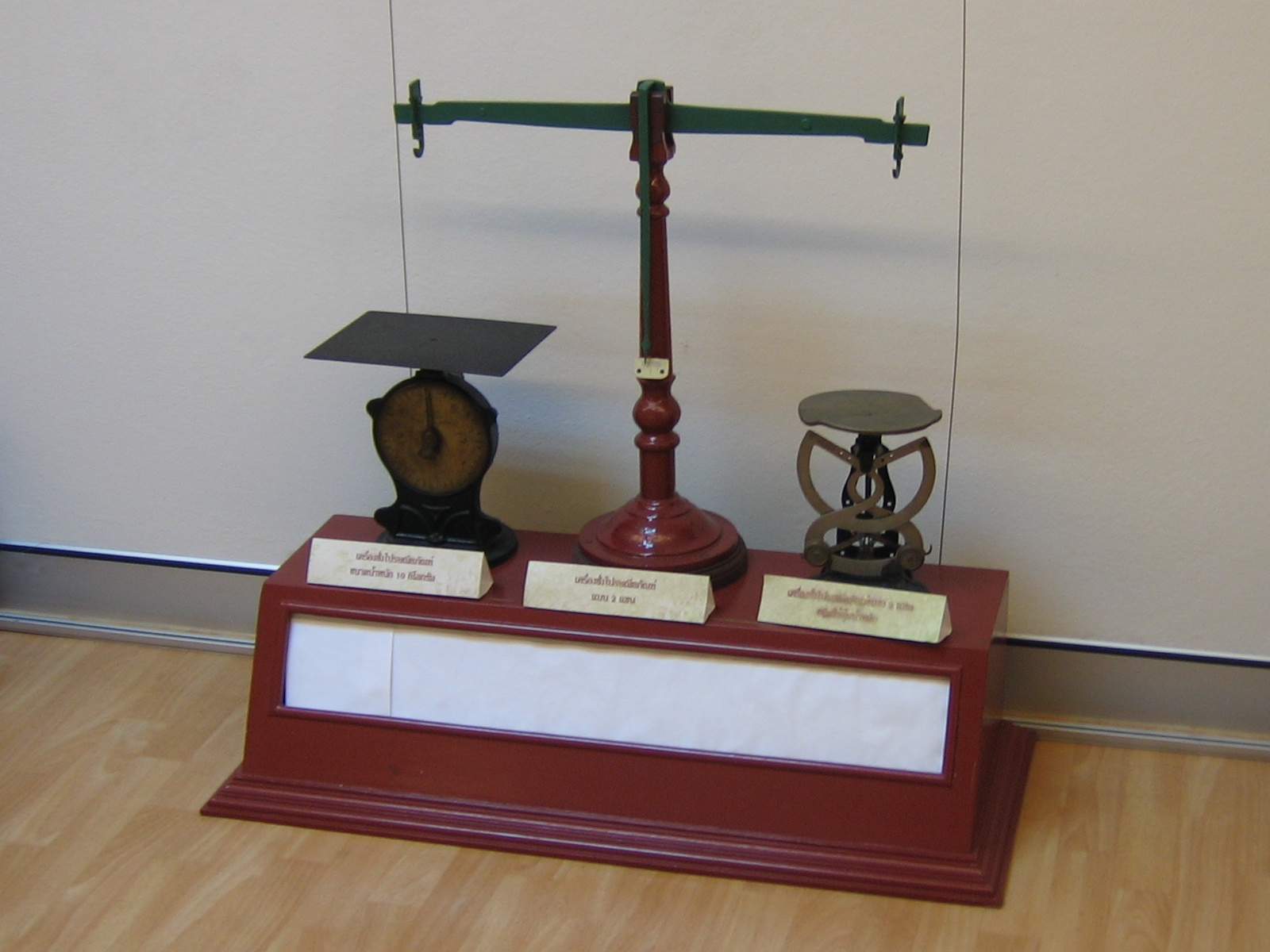
Postal scale inside the museum

It was renovated and moved to the building behind the Samsen Nai post office at Saphan Khwai in December 2004. Among its exhibits are the awards Thai philatelists received from various international competitions together with photocopies of the winning entries, posters depicting rare Thai stamps, and winning postage stamp designs.

In 2015, the Sen Nai Philatelic Museum hosted "Looking at the World Beyond the Rainbow", an exhibition showcasing North Korea through stamps.
