= Si Yan, Bangkok =

Neighbourhood in Bangkok

Coordinates: 13°47′07.29″N 100°30′42.43″E

Si Yan
- ศรีย่าน
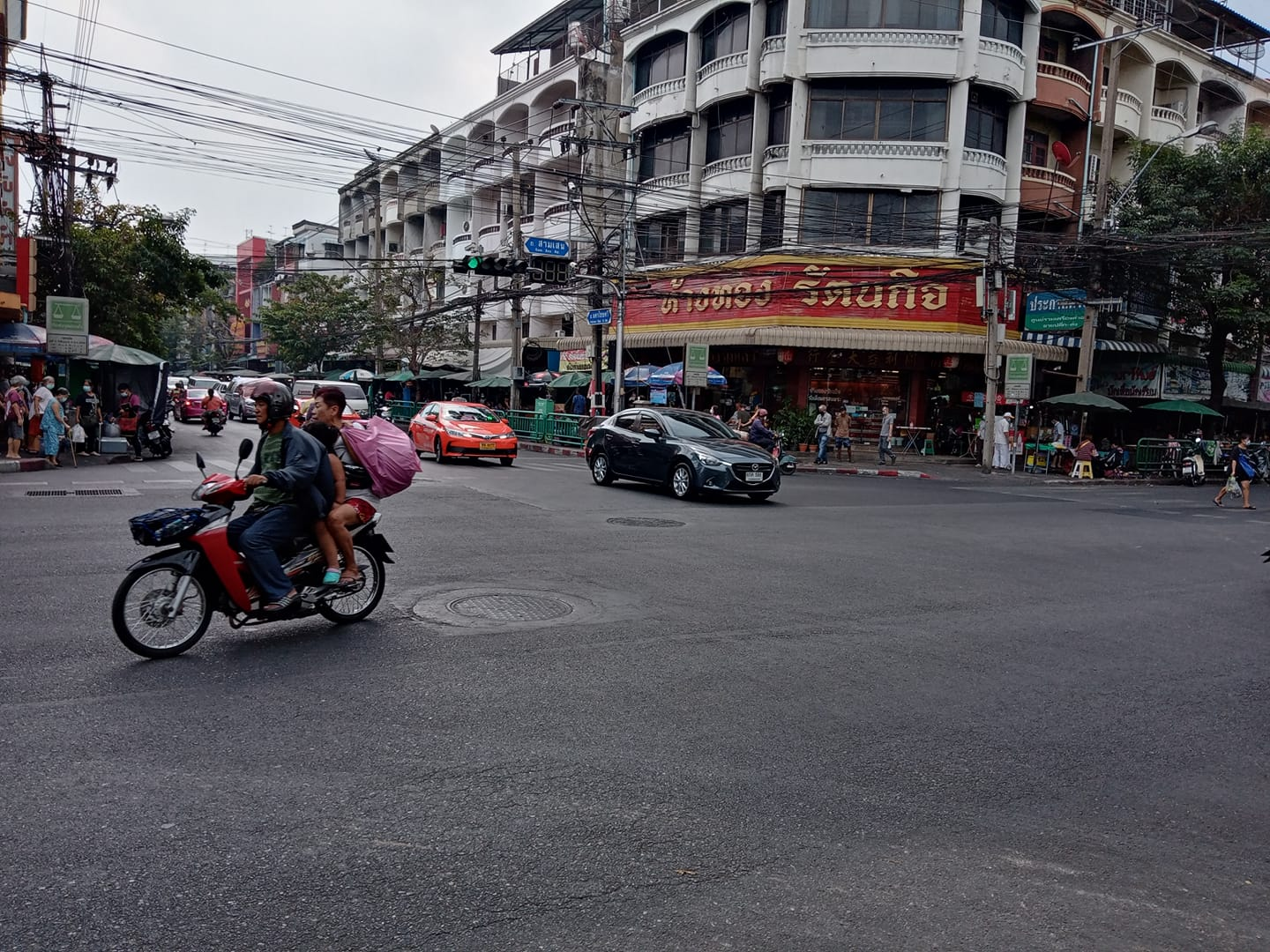
- Si Yan Intersection (looking towards the market), early 2021
- Interactive map of Si Yan

Location
- Thanon Nakhon Chai Si, Dusit, Bangkok
- Roads at junction: Samsen (south-north); Nakhon Chai Si (east–west)

Construction
- Type: Four-way at-grade intersection

Si Yan or Sri Yan (Thai: ศรีย่าน, pronounced [sǐː jâːn]) is a neighbourhood in Thanon Nakhon Chai Si Subdistrict, Dusit District, Bangkok. It roughly occupies the four-way intersection of the same name. The area famous for its market and restaurants with street food.

== History and location ==
Originally, the area was called "Payap" (พายัพ, pronounced [pʰaː˧.jap̚˦˥]) which means "northwestern" or "northern". Therefore, various places around it were also called Payap, such as Payap pier, Payap road, Payap market, Ban Payap, etc. After the revolution in 1932, Korn Chaturachinda, the owner of local shophouses and market, changed its name to "Si Yan" which means "auspicious quarter" for good fortune.

Si Yan intersection is where Samsen (which runs along Chao Phraya River from the north end of Bang Lamphu) cuts across Nakhon Chai Si Roads (which runs in a direct east–west) from Rama VI Road in neighbouring Phaya Thai District up until end at Payap pier on Chao Phraya River.

Payap used to be the residence of Prince Dilok Nopparat, the son of King Chulalongkorn (Rama V) who was born from the Royal Concubine Thipkesorn, who were descended from the Chet Ton Dynasty. The Payap pier was therefore used as a place where members of the Chet Ton Dynasty came to visit him in Bangkok by boat. At the end of the King Chulalongkorn's reign, it was the place where the new generation of nobles housed. Ban Payap, European style two-story white house is located on the northwest corner of the intersection. Now Operation Centre for Displaced Persons (OCDP), the Ministry of Interior. While Prince Dilok Nopparat's residence became part of Metropolitan Electricity Authority Hospital Samsen.

At present, Payap pier (N18) is one of the piers of the Chao Phraya Express Boat provides a service that takes passengers from downtown Bangkok to downtown Nonthaburi.

Si Yan is one of the oldest neighbourhoods in Samsen. It is both a market and a community of Thais and Thais of Chinese descent with a long history, at least contemporary with the World War II era. In that era, it was a place where there was a bomb shelter.

Trams used to run on Samsen Road between 1900 and 1968, passing Si Yan as well.

Nowadays, the nameplate over the market entrance is still spelled "สรีย่าน" according to the old spelling.

== Neighbourhoods ==
- Bang Krabue
- Kiak Kai
