= Soi Nana (Chinatown) =

Coordinates: 13.739448°N 100.514272°E

Soi Nana (Thai: ซอยนานา, pronounced [sɔ̄ːj nāːnāː]) is an alley linking Maitrichit Road and Rama IV Road in the area of Chinatown of Bangkok. It takes only 4 minutes to walk from Yaowarat Road. Nana is nestled between the old culture of China and the invading modernism. It is famous for being a hipster bar street in Bangkok where modern culture meets with the traditional Thai-Chinese culture of the Bangkok.

There is another Soi Nana, famous for the nightlife, in Sukhumvit.

== History ==
This little alley has always changed since the Era of "Gangsters in the City" (in the 1950s). In the 1950s and 1960s, Soi Nana used to be a horde of gangsters as almost every street of Bangkok had “owners”. The community in this era is dark and scary form the power of the gangs. When the time passed, all of those gangsters fell, and Soi Nana gradually changed into a large Chinese drugstore area according to immigrating Chinese who lived in the area. Until now, the smell of herbal remedies is still embedded in the community.

In the 2010s, from being isolated in the alley, it has started to come to life since there have been a lot of popping cafes and bars from the new generation. Nana is hit by the new wave which consists of joy and lively life of the new generations who come to this area to create a society of their era. There are many cafes, bars, restaurants and galleries in the streets.

"From gangsters to Chinese drug stores until now, Soi Nana is settle to be a place to support all kinds of people and allow them to rotate and create new meaning for this small alley" (Wonngwisethpiboon, 2017, para. 12)

== Reasons for popularity ==
Soi Nana is a good alternative nightlife spot to escape from the familiarity of Bangkok like Sathorn, Sukhumvit, or Silom area. "The unassuming and utterly charming Soi Nana in Yaowarat has gained momentum as a destination for intrepid drinkers and art lovers" (Doman, 2018, para. 1). The theme and style of bars and restaurants in this street is mainly about cultural content of the community, for example modern Chinese bars and restaurants that serve modern Thai-Chinese food and cocktails, There are modern traditional Thai bars that serve some Thais drinks and play traditional Thai music or modern Thai teen movies. Even Though it is located in Yaowarat (Chinatown), this area is offering new experiences to customers in the same level as 5 star bars and restaurants.

== See also ==
- List of neighbourhoods in Bangkok
