= Bang Krabue, Bangkok =

Coordinates: 13°47′21.74″N 100°30′52.65″E

Bang Krabue
- บางกระบือ
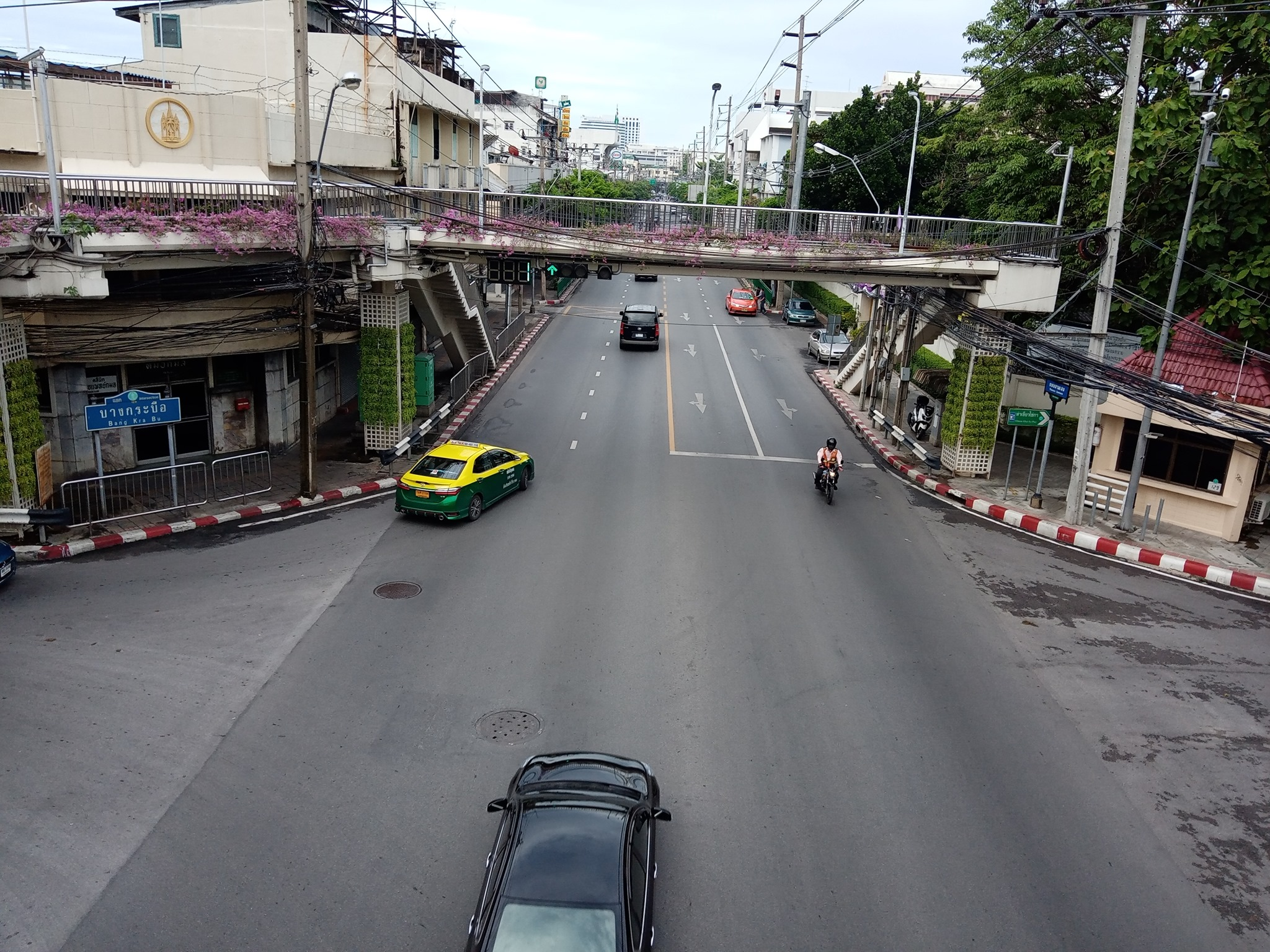
- Bang Krabue Intersection view backward Si Yan area
- Interactive map of Bang Krabue

Location
- Thanon Nakhon Chai Si, Dusit, Bangkok, Thailand
- Roads at junction: Samsen (north–south); Amnuai Songkhram (east); Kheaw Khai Ka (west)

Construction
- Type: Four-way at-grade intersection with four-way footbridge

Bang Krabue (Thai: บางกระบือ, pronounced [bāːŋ krā.bɯ̄ː]) is an intersection and neighbourhood in Bangkok's Thanon Nakhon Chai Si Sub-district, Dusit District.

== Characteristics ==
This area is located at the four-corner junction where Samsen, Amnuai Songkhram, and Kheaw Khai Ka Roads meet. It lies midway between the Si Yan and Kiakkai Intersections on Samsen Road, and is home to Sappaya-Sapasathan, the current Parliament House of Thailand. In the future, it will be served by the Parliament House MRT station.

== History ==
"Bang Krabue" literally means "a community of water buffaloes." Historically, the area served as a hub for cattle trading. Ranchers from Thailand's northeastern region, known in the Isan dialect as nai hoi (นายฮ้อย), would drive their herds toward the city, stopping first at Saphan Khwai before finalizing their deals here. The Thai word krabue (กระบือ), meaning "water buffalo," is derived from the Khmer word krabei (ក្របី).

Bang Krabue occupies a section of Samsen Road running along the Chao Phraya River toward Bang Sue, near the border with Nonthaburi Province.

During the reign of King Rama V, Bang Krabue was a tambon (sub-district) comprising 13 muban (villages), under the administration of Bang Sue District in Phra Nakhon Province (present-day Bangkok). At the time, the primary transportation route was Khlong Bang Krabue, a canal linking the Chao Phraya River with Khlong Prem Prachakon near Wat Bang Krabue Bridge.

During the reign of King Rama VI, the area flourished with rice mills, ports, docks, and warehouses. It was also the original site of the liquor factory owned by Phraya Bhirom Bhakdi, now known as Boon Rawd Brewery. In winter, the area would become a seasonal habitat for large flocks of migratory gulls from the Northern Hemisphere.

Additionally, before 1968, Bang Krabue was served by two of Bangkok's tram lines, making it a key transport corridor of that era.

== Nearby places ==
- Boon Rawd Brewery
- Royal Irrigation Department
- Rajinibon School
- Wat Chan Samoson and Wat Chan Samoson School
- Makro Samsen
- Supreme Complex
