= Wat Kaew Fah Chulamanee =

Buddhist temple in Bangkok, Thailand

- Wat Kaew Fah Bon
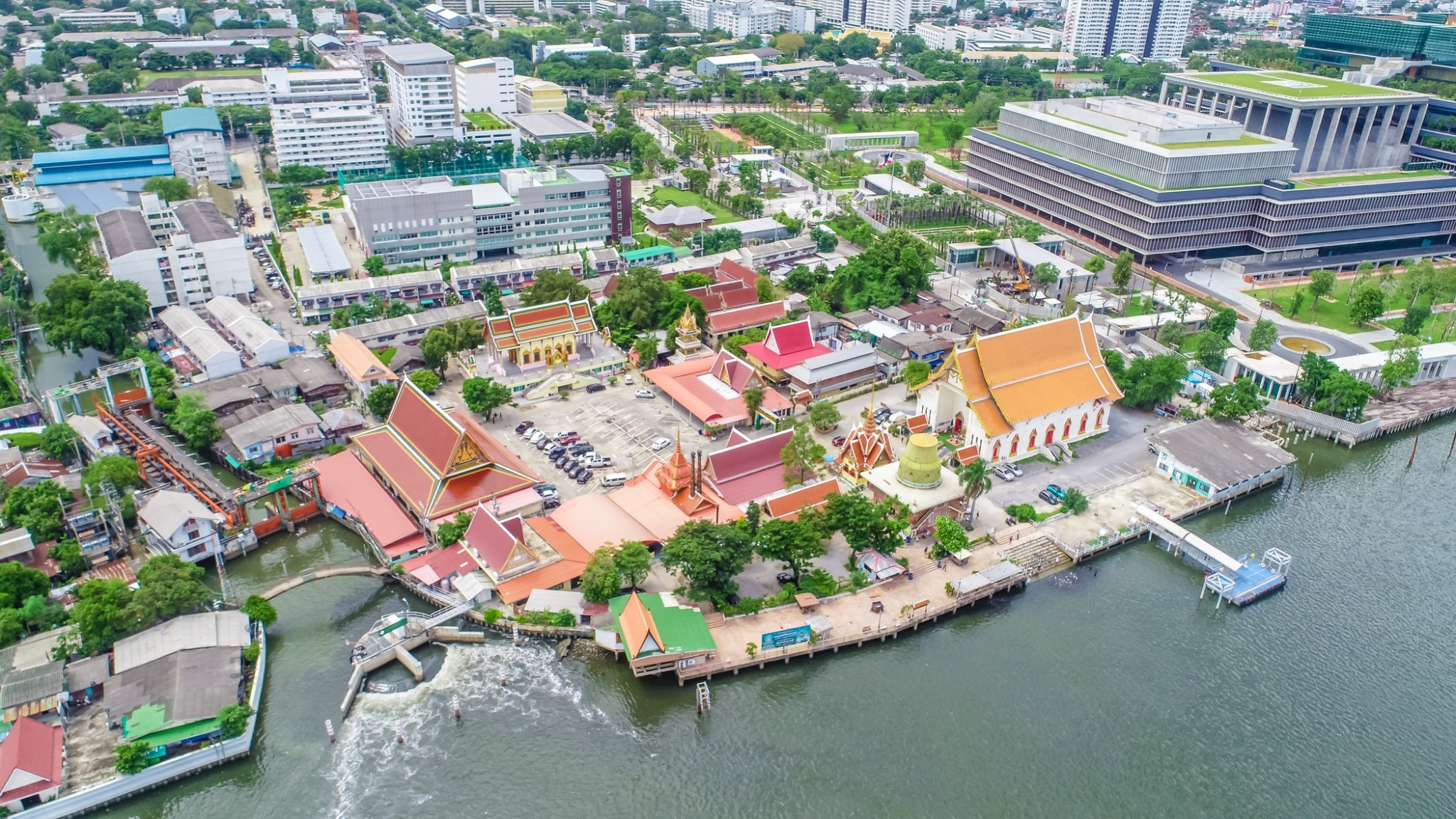
- Aerial view of the temple

- Location within Bangkok

Religion
- Affiliation: Buddhism
- Sect: Theravāda Mahā Nikāya
- Status: Civil temple

Location
- Location: 9 Thahan rd, Thanon Nakhon Chai Si, Dusit, Bangkok 10300
- Country: Thailand
- Interactive map of Wat Kaew Fah Chulamanee
- Coordinates: 13.799459°N 100.518564°E

Architecture
- Founder: Unknown
- Completed: 1757

Wat Kaew Fah Chulamanee (Thai: วัดแก้วฟ้าจุฬามณี) is an ancient Thai Buddhist temple in Bangkok. It can be considered as another house of worship next to the Chao Phraya river.

== History ==
The temple is civil monastery located at the mouth of Khlong Bang Sue canal. At first, it was named Wat Bang Sue (วัดบางซื่อ), otherwise referred to as Wat Kaew Fah Bon (วัดแก้วฟ้าบน, "upper Kaew Fah temple") to pair with Wat Kaew Jam Fah, also known as Wat Kaew Fah Lang (วัดแก้วฟ้าล่าง, "lower Kaew Fah temple"), which is located in the Si Phraya neighbourhood. This was called in the direction of their location along the Chao Phraya river.

It was a covered area of 5.2 acres. There is no precise proof that tells exactly when the temple was built. The only proof is a letter from the former abbot to the Department of Religious Affairs in 1954 which indicates that this temple was built around 1757, the end of the Ayutthaya period.

The crematorium is situated in the central area of the temple. The monk's dwellings and the ubosot (ordination hall) are on the right of the temple. The murals in the ubosot depict Jataka tales (ten lives of the Lord Buddha).

Inside the vihara (sanctuary) is enshrined Luang Pho Siri Aisawan (หลวงพ่อศิริไอย์ศวรรย์), also known locally as Luang Pho Siri (หลวงพ่อศิริ), the principal Buddha image. In addition, this place also houses a pair of Thao Wessuwan and Rahu outside the vihara and the ubosot as well.

At first, the temple was located next to the bend of the canal. The location of the ubosot was not so far from the bend of the canal, and the soil was slowly eroding until it almost reached the gate of the chapel and the chedi (pagoda) Chulamanee, which was in front of the ubosot. Therefore, the ubosot was moved to the present location during the King Chulalongkorn (Rama V)'s reign.

== Location ==
Wat Kaew Fah Chulamanee is located at the beginning of Thahan road near Kiak Kai pier (N21) and the parliament house, Sappaya-Sapasathan.

== Gallery ==
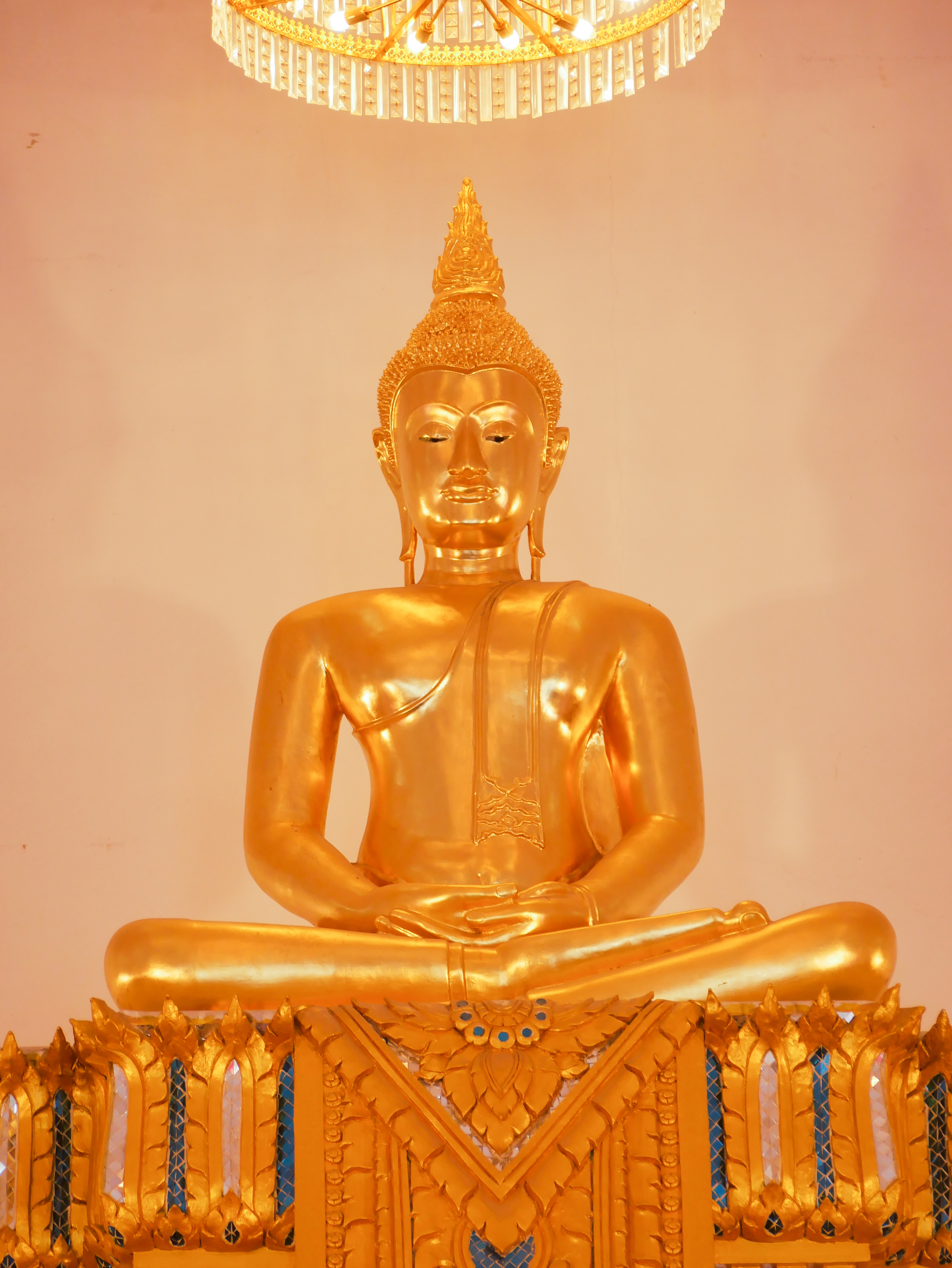
Luang Pho Siri Aisawan

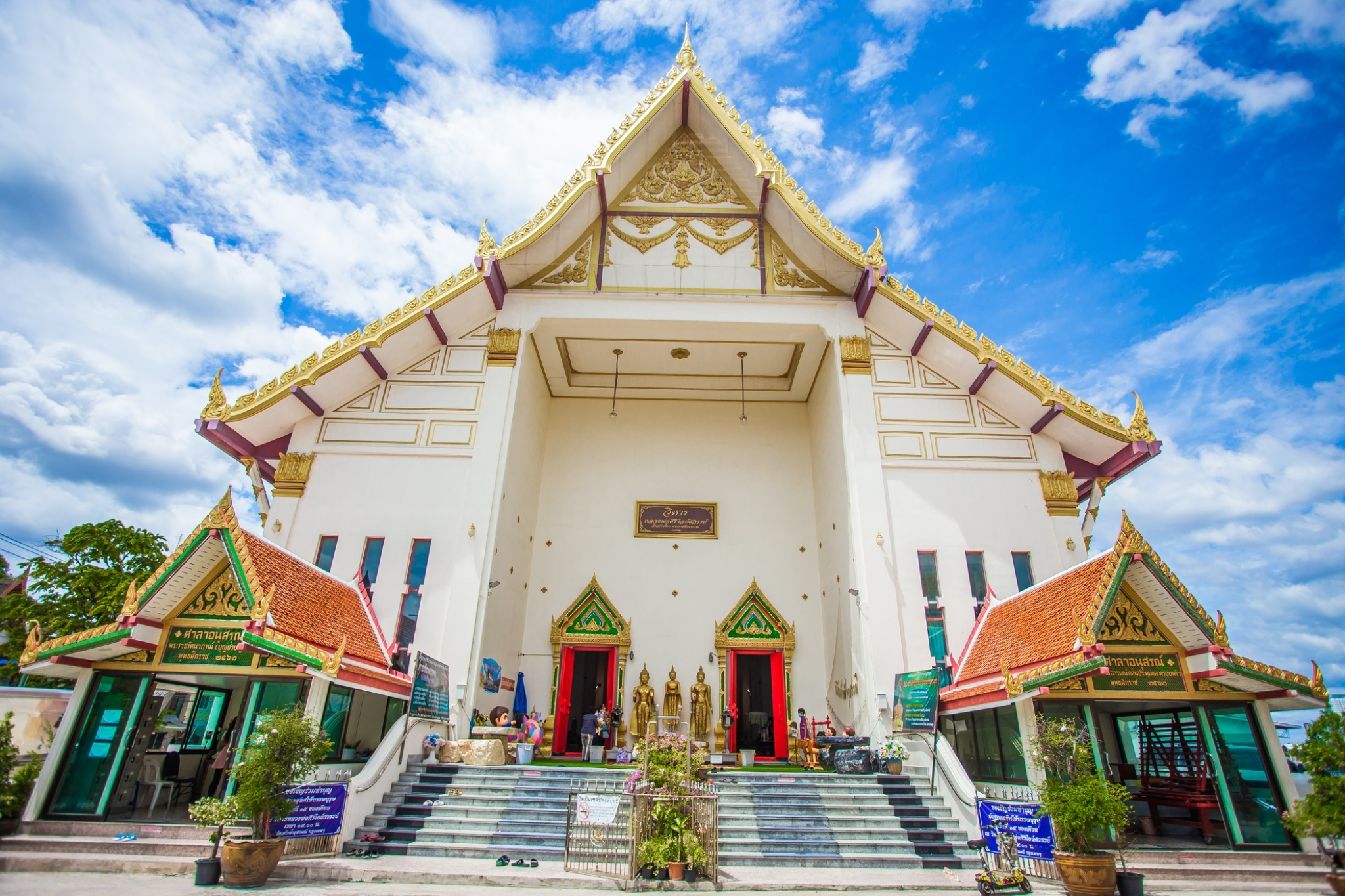
The vihara

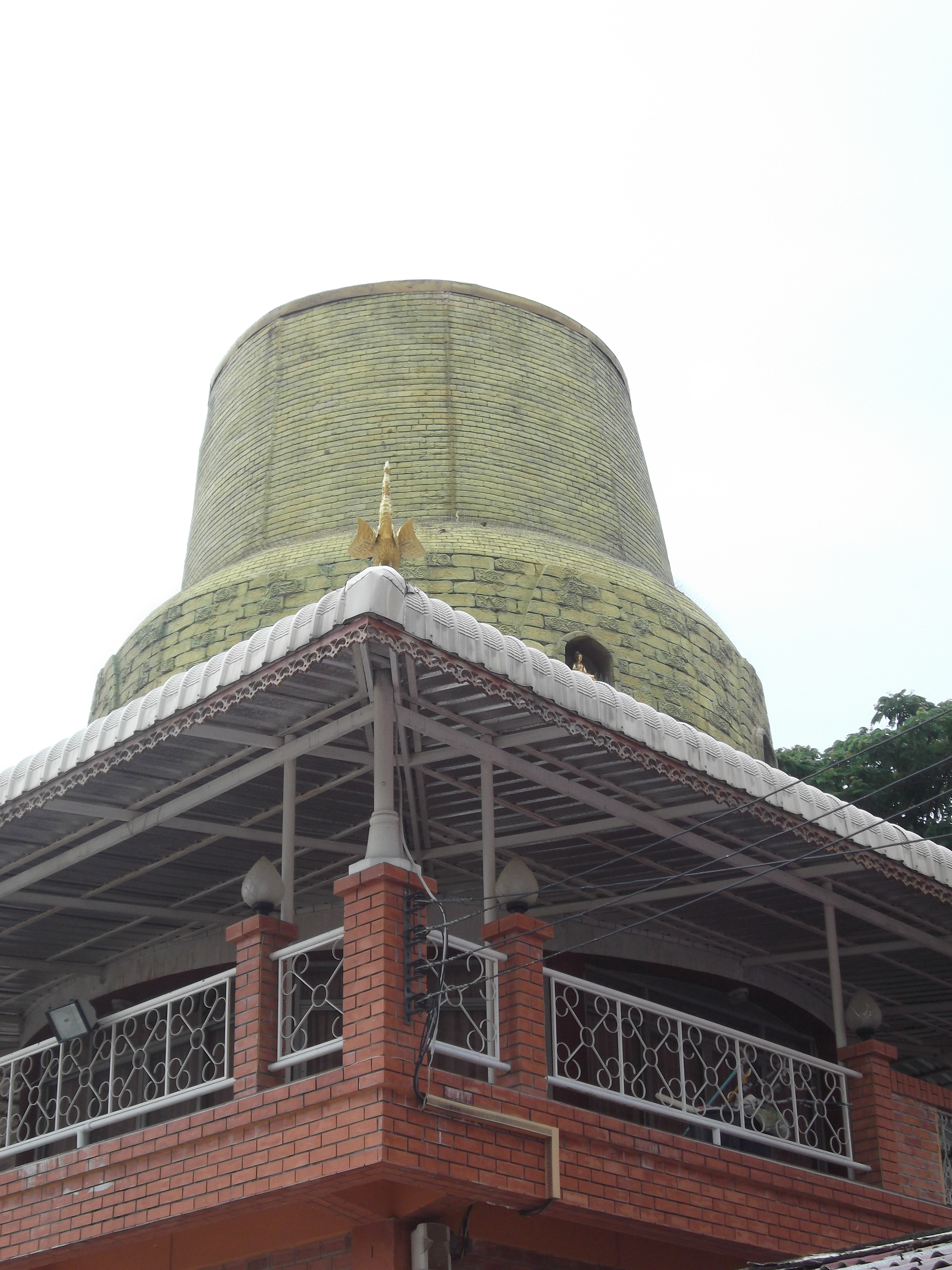
Chulamanee pagoda

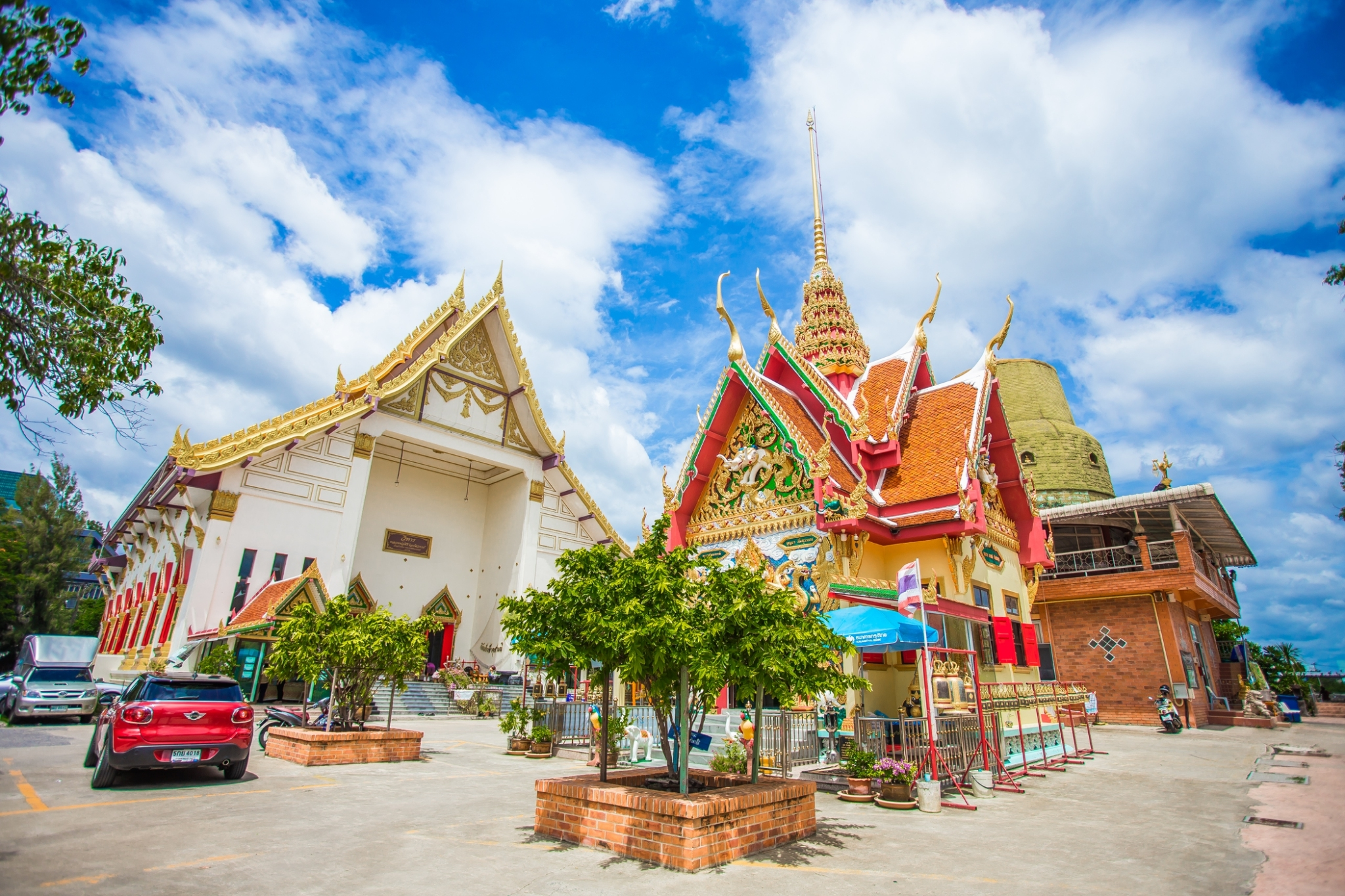
The vihara and the ubosot
