= Nakhon Chai Si Road =

Road in Bangkok, Thailand

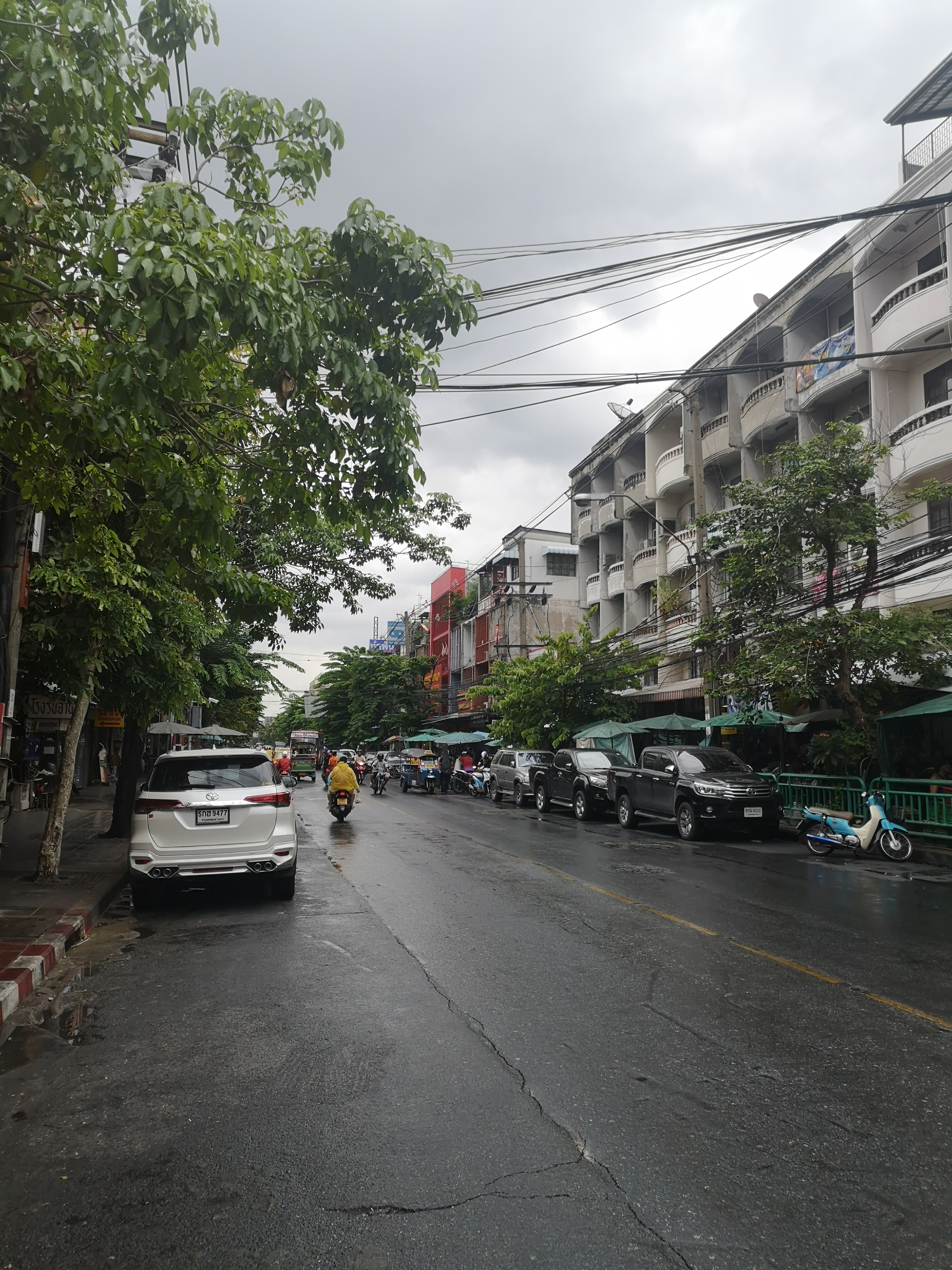
- Nakhon Chai Si Road near Si Yan Intersection in mid-2019.
- Interactive map of Nakhon Chai Si Road
- Native name: ถนนนครไชยศรี
- Former name: Ratchawat Road
- Length: 3.185 km (1.979 mi)
- Location: Bangkok, Thailand
- Coordinates: 13°46′50″N 100°31′13″E
- Southeast end: Rama VI Road, Phaya Thai
- Northwest end: Payap Pier, Dusit

Nakhon Chai Si Road (Thai: ถนนนครไชยศรี; pronounced [tʰā.nǒn ná(ʔ).kʰɔ̄ːn t͡ɕʰāj sǐː]) is a road in Bangkok. Its name is origin of Thanon Nakhon Chai Si Subdistrict of Dusit District, since it runs through the area.

It starts from Rama VI Road, passing Rama V, Pichai, Nakhon Ratchasima, Samsen Roads, then cuts across Si Yan Intersection, as far as ends at the Chao Phraya River at the Payap Pier. The total distance is 3.185 km (2.0 mi).

Previously, it was named "Rachawat Road" (ถนนราชวัตร). Its name was derived from a kind of Chinese porcelain with a fence-like pattern, which was a collector's item in those days. It was a road that King Chulalongkorn (Rama V) graciously ordered to be constructed and it was also one of the roads in the group of "Amphoe (district) Dusit Roads Project" that was jointly started with the construction of Suan Dusit Palace in 1898 itself was blocking the pathway of the people that resided within that area, so for the convenience of transportation and communications for the public, the king graciously ordered that Ratchawat Road was to be built around Suan Dusit Palace and also the convenience of the travelling between the northern outer suburb and inner capital, and between Sam Sen Railway Station and up till the Chao Phraya River.

Later on February 16, 1919, which corresponds to the King Vajiravudh (Rama VI)'s reign, he graciously ordered that the name of Ratchawat Road that started from the Chao Phraya River to Prathat Thong Road (now Rama VI Road) to be changed as "Nakhon Chai Si Road" in honour of Prince Chirapravati Voradej, Prince of Nakhon Chai Si, one of sons of King Chulalongkorn and half brother of King Vajiravudh, whose considered as "Father of the Thai Army".

Although it is relatively short, Nakhon Chai Si Road passes through several notable landmarks, including Ratchawat Bridge, which spans the Khlong Prem Prachakon near the Dusit District Office, as well as Wat Amphawan, Wat Sawatwaree Simaram, and the Ratchawat and Si Yan Markets. In addition, the area along the road is commonly known as "Ratchawat," reflecting its former name.The stretch around Ratchawat, extending to nearby Si Yan, is renowned for its cluster of exceptional beef noodle restaurants.

Nakhon Chai Si Road in the 1940s was still a quiet, unpaved road. Both sides were lined with mahogany trees, much like Ratchadamnoen Avenue. It was common to see Muslims and Hindus herding cattle to graze on the nearby Phaya Thai fields.
