= Soi Mo Leng =

Coordinates: 13.758546°N 100.545951°E

Soi Mo Leng (Thai: ซอยหมอเหล็ง, pronounced [sɔːj mɔ̌ː léŋ]), officially known as Soi Ratchaphan (ซอยรัชฏภัณฑ์, [sɔːj rát.t͡ɕʰa.tà.pʰan]), is more widely recognized by its informal name, Soi Mo Leng. It is a side street off Ratchaprarop Road, located in Makkasan Subdistrict, Ratchathewi District, Bangkok, near the Victory Monument. At present, the Si Rat Expressway runs overhead along this area.

== History ==
Soi Mo Leng is a small and relatively quiet residential lane, characterized by typical housing for middle- to lower-income residents in Bangkok. The name of the lane derives from Dr. Leng Srichan (Mo Leng), a military physician who led the group involved in the Palace Revolt of 1912 during the early reign of King Rama VI. He once resided in this lane, in a small two-story half-concrete, half-wood house. Mo Leng was a well-known physician of his time and notably delivered Samak Sundaravej in 1935, who later became the 25th Prime Minister of Thailand.

In contemporary political context, the lane is also well known as the location of the Bangkok residence of Chuan Leekpai, the 20th Prime Minister of Thailand. He lived for many years at house number 417/1, a small two-story wooden house. The house does not belong to him; rather, he rented it from a friend, Preecha Chawalitthamrong, a former customs officer at Bangkok International Airport (Don Mueang). Prior to Chuan Leekpai's first term as prime minister in 1992, the area was characterized by old wooden row houses and aging concrete shophouses, with some detached houses interspersed throughout. There were approximately five to six small grocery shops and around eight to nine street food vendors. One restaurant, in particular, played loud music from a jukebox almost throughout the night, contributing to noise disturbances. Overall, the environment was considered rather poor, with various social issues such as local gangs, drug problems, motorcycle taxi rackets, and the presence of sex workers.

A long-time elderly resident recalled that outsiders entering the area were expected to behave cautiously and modestly, as it was not a place where one could walk around confidently. However, after Chuan Leekpai became prime minister, conditions improved noticeably. The entrance road, which had previously been unpaved, was asphalted, and a police booth was installed at the entrance to enhance security. Local gangs gradually disappeared, and the overall environment became more orderly.

Even today, more than 30 years later, the general character of Soi Mo Leng remains largely similar in its residential nature.

== See more ==
- Mo Chit, a neighborhood in Bangkok whose name begins with the word "Mo" (physician).
- Mo Mi, a five-way intersection and a neighborhood in Bangkok's Chinatown share a similar origin for their names
