= Makkasan =

Coordinates: 13°45′21.57″N 100°32′32.64″E

Makkasan มักกะสัน
- Khwaeng
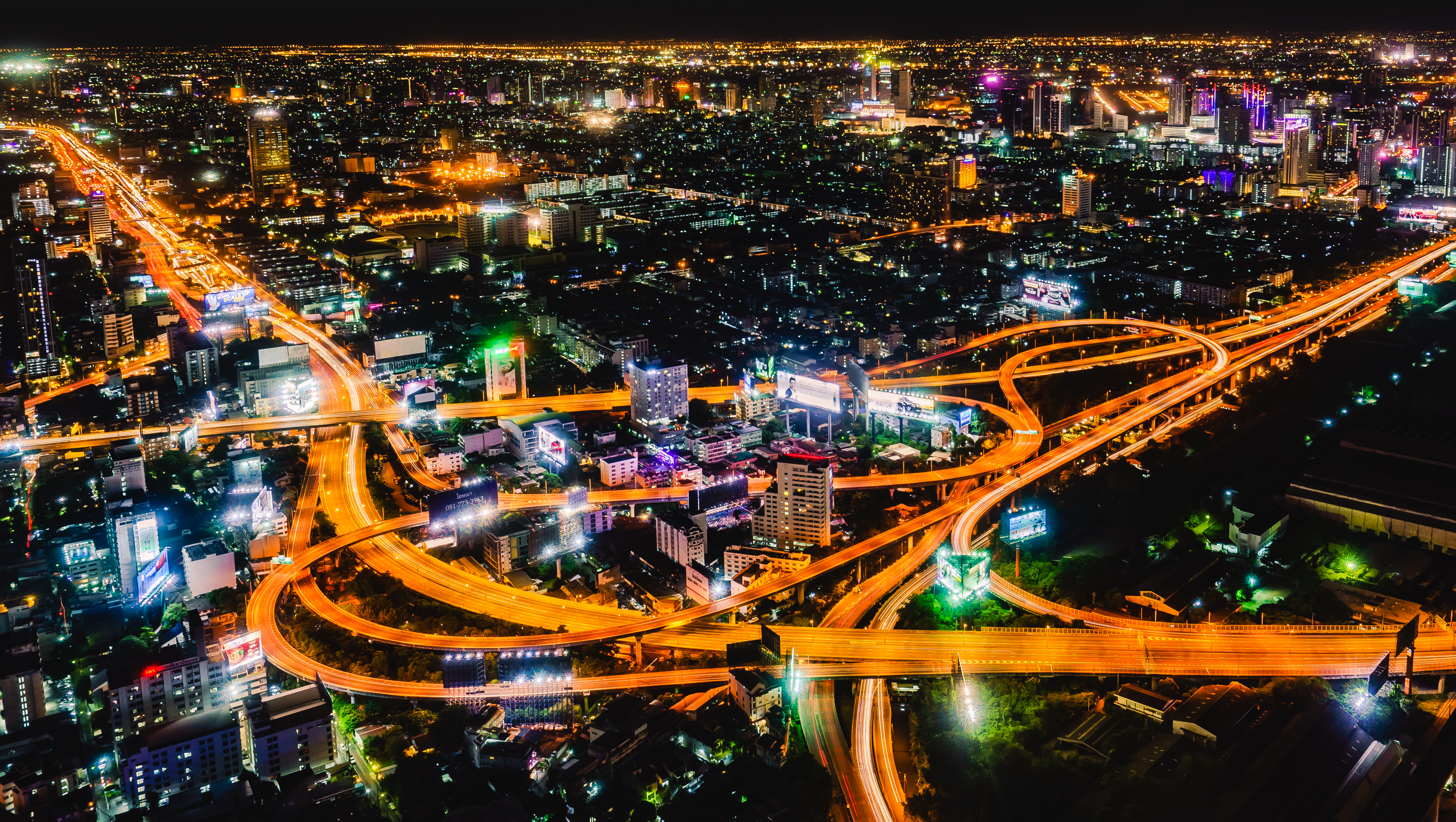
- Makkasan Interchange in the Makkasan neighbourhood at night

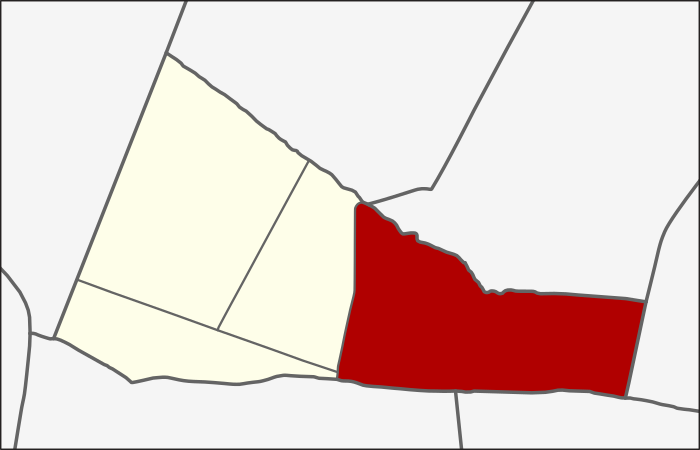
- Location in Ratchathewi District
- Country: Thailand
- Province: Bangkok
- Khet: Ratchathewi

Area
  - Total: 2.283 km^{2} (0.881 sq mi)

Population (2020)
  - Total: 15,815
- Time zone: UTC+7 (ICT)
- Postal code: 10400
- TIS 1099: 103704

Makkasan (Thai: มักกะสัน, pronounced [mák.kā.sǎn]) is the name of an intersection and the surrounding neighbourhood in Bangkok's Ratchathewi district. It is one of the khwaengs (sub-districts) of Bangkok.

== Name ==
Makkasan is named after the Makassar people, the Muslims who fled the Dutch attack in 1905 to Bangkok and were permitted by King Chulalongkorn to settle around the east of Bangkok.

== Intersections ==
Makkasan Intersection is divided into two closely located intersections. One is the meeting point of Ratchaprarop Road, Chaturathit Road, Si Ayutthaya Road, and Soi Ratchaprarop 10 or Soi Mo Leng, and is known variously as Makkasan, Mo Leng or Ratchaprarop Intersection. The other is the intersection of Ratchaprarop Road and Nikhom Makkasan Road, named Nikhom Makkasan intersection. The area is considered one of the most prone to traffic jams in Bangkok, especially during rush hour. Makkasan is not far from major shopping districts and Bangkok's traffic centers, such as Pratunam or Victory Monument.

== Incidents ==
=== Makkasan black panther ===
Around mid-1981, the Makkasan became widely known after reports emerged of a black panther roaming and causing disturbances in the area surrounding the Makkasan Workshop of the State Railway of Thailand (SRT), an overgrown and abandoned area covering more than 500 rai (197 acre), filled with dense vegetation and water sources, making it an ideal hiding place for wildlife. The incident raised a mystery as to how such a large wild animal could end up in the heart of Bangkok, and it caused widespread fear among the public. The animal became known as the "Makkasan Black Panther" (เสือดำมักกะสัน). Authorities spent as long as 46 days tracking the animal before finally capturing it and releasing it into Huai Kha Khaeng Wildlife Sanctuary.

Amid the buzz, rumors surfaced about two years later suggesting that the panther had actually been deliberately released for certain political purposes.

=== 2026 train collision ===
At 3:35 PM on Saturday, 16 May 2026, a freight train collided with a Bangkok Mass Transit Authority (BMTA) air-conditioned bus, route 3-30 (206), at a railway crossing near Makkasan Station. The accident resulted in 8 fatalities and 35 injuries, becoming one of the most serious railway accidents in Thailand.

== Places ==
- Tourism Authority of Thailand (TAT)
- Bangkok Doll Museum
- Soi Ratchataphan (also known as Soi Mo Leng)
