= Saphan Khwai BTS station =

Railway station in Bangkok, Thailand

Saphan Khwai สะพานควาย
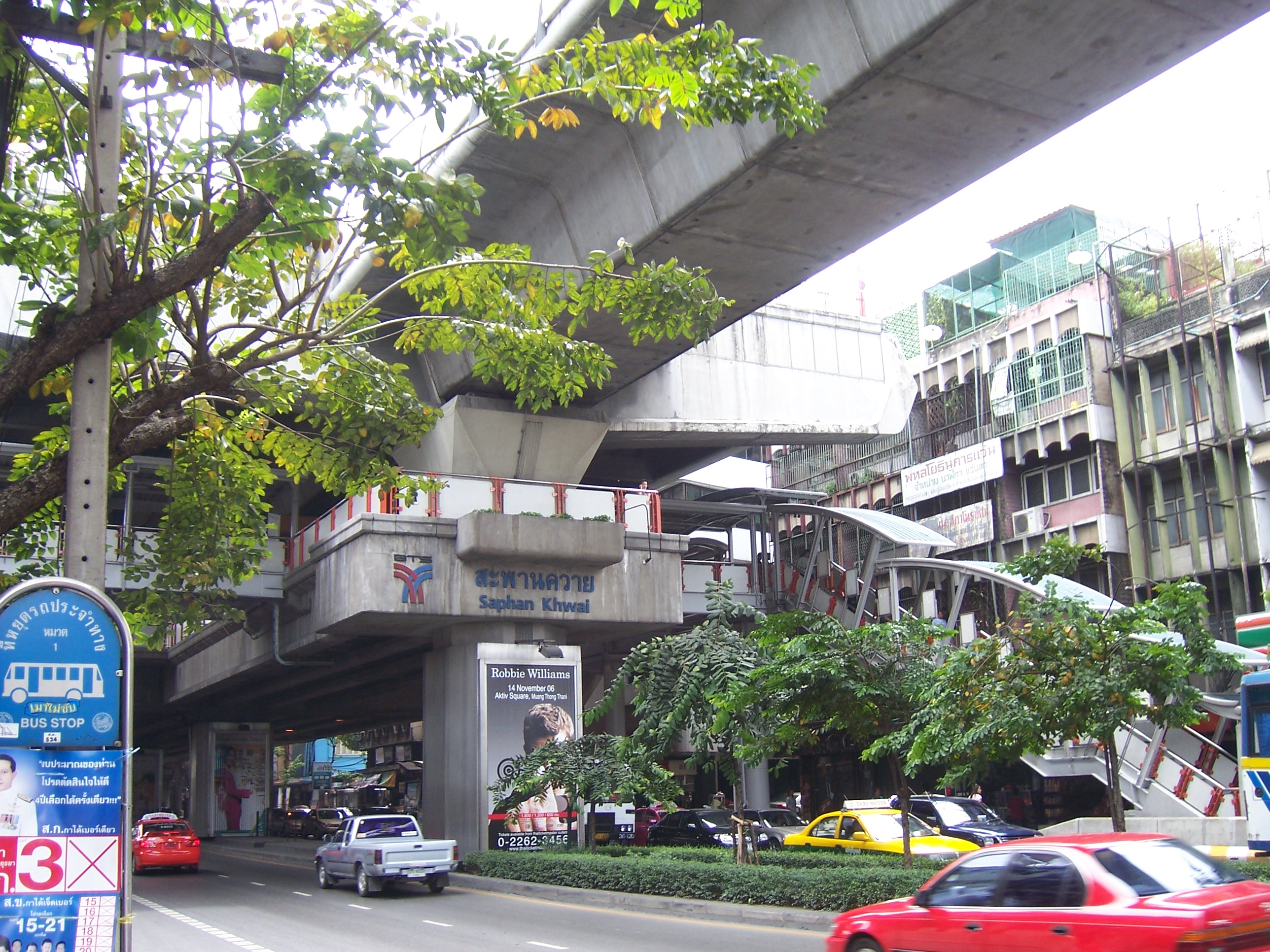
- Saphan Khwai station

General information
- Location: Phaya Thai; Bangkok; Thailand
- Coordinates: 13°47′37.68″N 100°32′59.03″E
- System: BTS
- Owner: Bangkok Metropolitan Administration (BMA); BTS Rail Mass Transit Growth Infrastructure Fund (BTSGIF)
- Operator: Bangkok Mass Transit System; Public Company Limited (BTSC)
- Line: Sukhumvit Line

Other information
- Station code: N7

History
- Opened: 5 December 1999

Passengers
- 2021: 1,427,958

Services
| Preceding station | BTS Skytrain | Following station |
|---|---|---|
| Mo Chit towards Khu Khot | Sukhumvit Line | Ari towards Kheha |
Location

Saphan Khwai Station Traditional sign

Saphan Khwai station (Thai: สถานีสะพานควาย, pronounced [sā.tʰǎː.nīː sā.pʰāːn kʰwāːj]) is a BTS skytrain station, on the Sukhumvit Line in Phaya Thai District, Bangkok, Thailand. The station is located on Phahonyothin Road near Saphan Khwai intersection, in a dense trade area with many shops, fresh markets and apartments, at the front of Saphan Khwai market and Paolo Memorial Hospital. Big C Supercenter (Saphan Khwai branch) and Thai Philatelic Museum (stamp museum) at Sam Sen Nai post office are located to the south of the station.

== See also ==
- Bangkok Skytrain
