= Thanon Nakhon Chai Si subdistrict =

Thanon Nakhon Chai Si ถนนนครไชยศรี
- Khwaeng
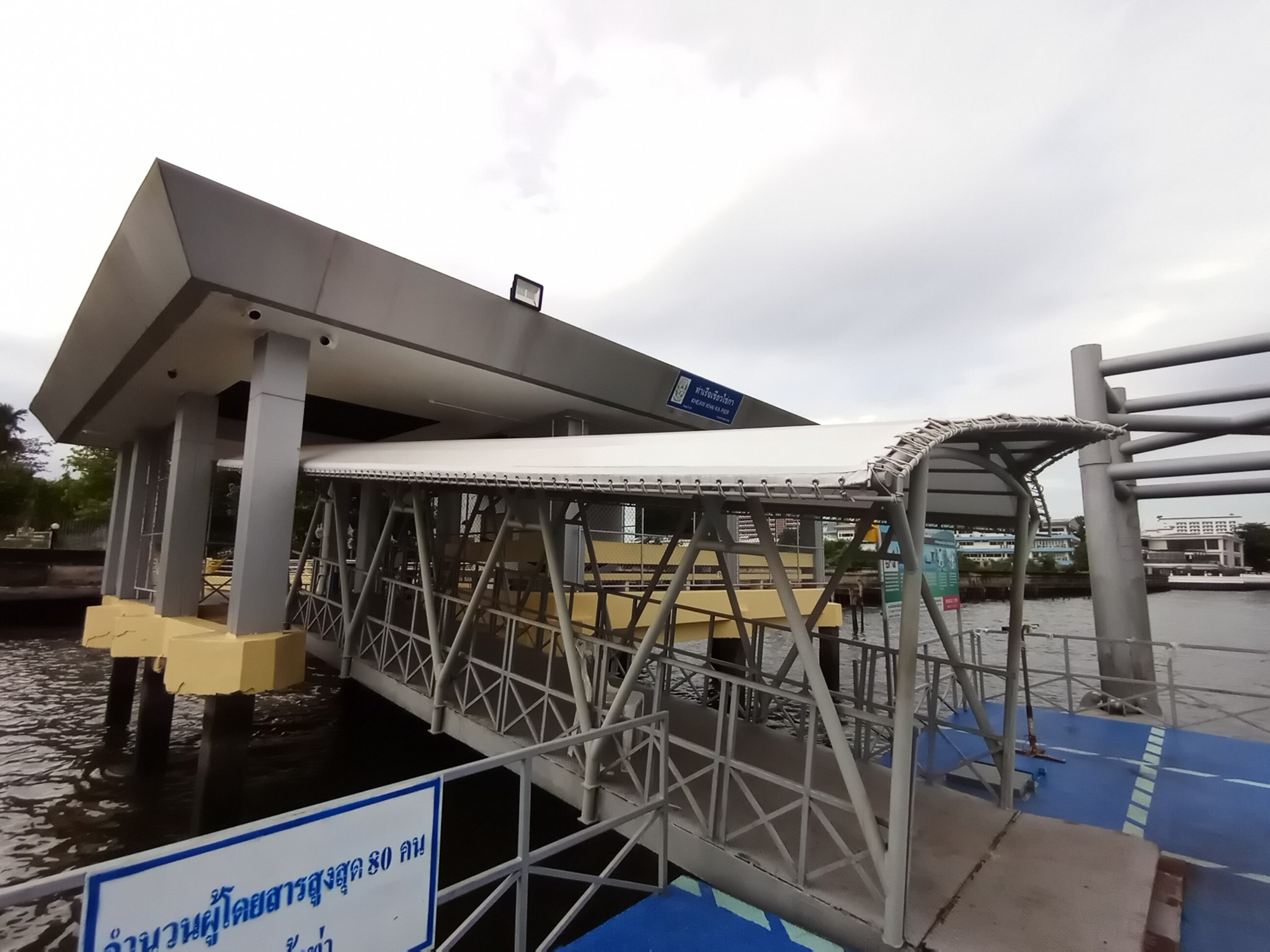
- Kheaw Khai Ka Pier (N20)

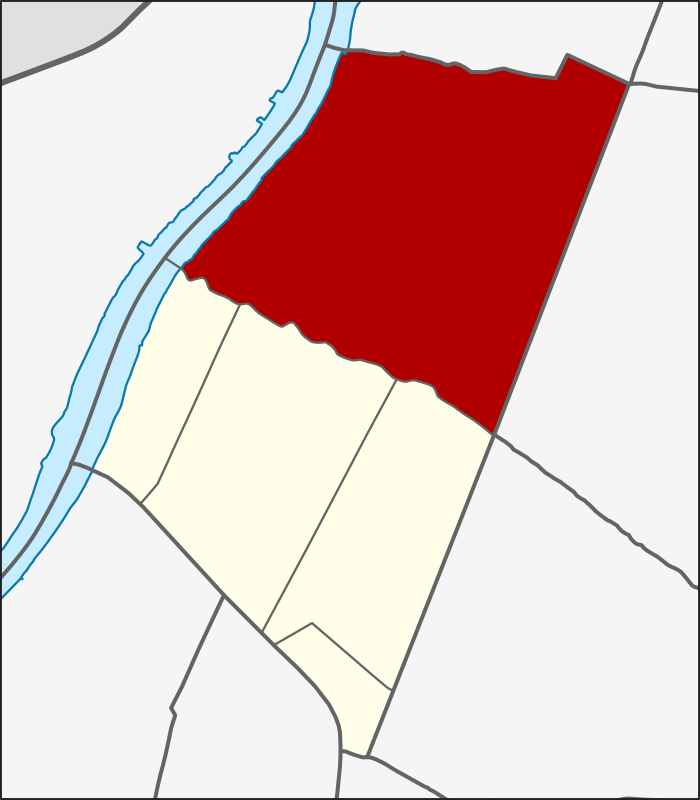
- Location in Dusit District
- Country: Thailand
- Province: Bangkok
- Khet: Dusit

Area
  - Total: 5.282 km^{2} (2.039 sq mi)

Population (2017)
  - Total: 55,094
- Time zone: UTC+7 (ICT)
- Postal code: 10300
- TIS 1099: 100206

Thanon Nakhon Chai Si (Thai: ถนนนครไชยศรี; pronounced [tʰā.nǒn ná(ʔ).kʰɔ̄ːn t͡ɕʰāj sǐː]) is a khwaeng (sub-district) of Dusit District, in Bangkok, Thailand.

== Description ==
The name "Thanon Nakhon Chai Si" comes from a road in same name that passes through the southern part of the area. The 3.185 km (2.0 mi) long road runs from the east in Phaya Thai District, entering Dusit area before ended up at Payap pier by the Chao Phraya River. The area that this road passes through is a residential community and a market. It is better known as "Rachawat" after its original name.

Yothinburana School used to be situated at Kiak Kai (termination of Samsen road) and moved out in 2008 because of construction of new parliament house (Sappaya-Sapasathan).

Besides, Thanon Nakhon Chai Si is also home to several military units under the Royal Thai Army, such as 1st Cavalry Regiment, King's Guard; 1st Field Artillery Battalion, King's Guard; 4th Cavalry Division King's Guard; and Military Armoured Vehicle Radio Station etc.

== Geography ==
Thanon Nakhon Chai Si has a total area of 5.282 km^{2} (2.039 mi^{2}), considered as the northernmost and the largest area of the district.

Neighbouring sub-districts are (from the north clockwise): Bang Sue of Bang Sue District (Khlong Bang Sue is a divider line), Phaya Thai of Phaya Thai District (Northern railway line is a divider line), Suan Chitlada, Dusit, and Wachiraphayaban in its district (Khlong Samsen is a divider line), Bang Phlat and Bang O of Bang Phlat District (midstream of Chao Phraya is a divider line).

== Demography ==
In 2017 it had a population of 55,094 people.

== Places ==
(except military bases)

=== Important places ===
- Sappaya-Sapasathan
- Boon Rawd Brewery
- Rajinibon School
- Royal Irrigation Department
- Metropolitan Electricity Authority, Samsen Zonal
- Bang Krabue Post Office
- Dusit Post Office
- Excise Department

=== Temples ===
- Wat Chan Samoson
- Wat Pracha Rabue Tham
- Wat Kaew Fa Chulamani
- Wat Amphawan
- Wat Chom Sudaram
- Wat Mai Thong Sen

=== Shopping malls ===
- Ratchawat Market
- Si Yan Market
- Makro Samsen
- Supreme Complex

== Transportation ==
Nakhon Chai Si, Samsen, Rama V, Thahan, Thoet Damri and Pradiphat roads are the main thoroughfare of the area.

Thanon Nakhon Chai Si is served by Chao Phraya Express Boat's four piers: Payap (N18), Irrigation Dept.(N19), Kheaw Khai Ka (N20), Kiak Kai (N21).

Sam Sen railway station of the State Railway of Thailand site on the border of the district with Phaya Thai.
