= Pradiphat Road =

Road in Bangkok, Thailand

Coordinates: 13°47′32.74″N 100°32′32.2″E

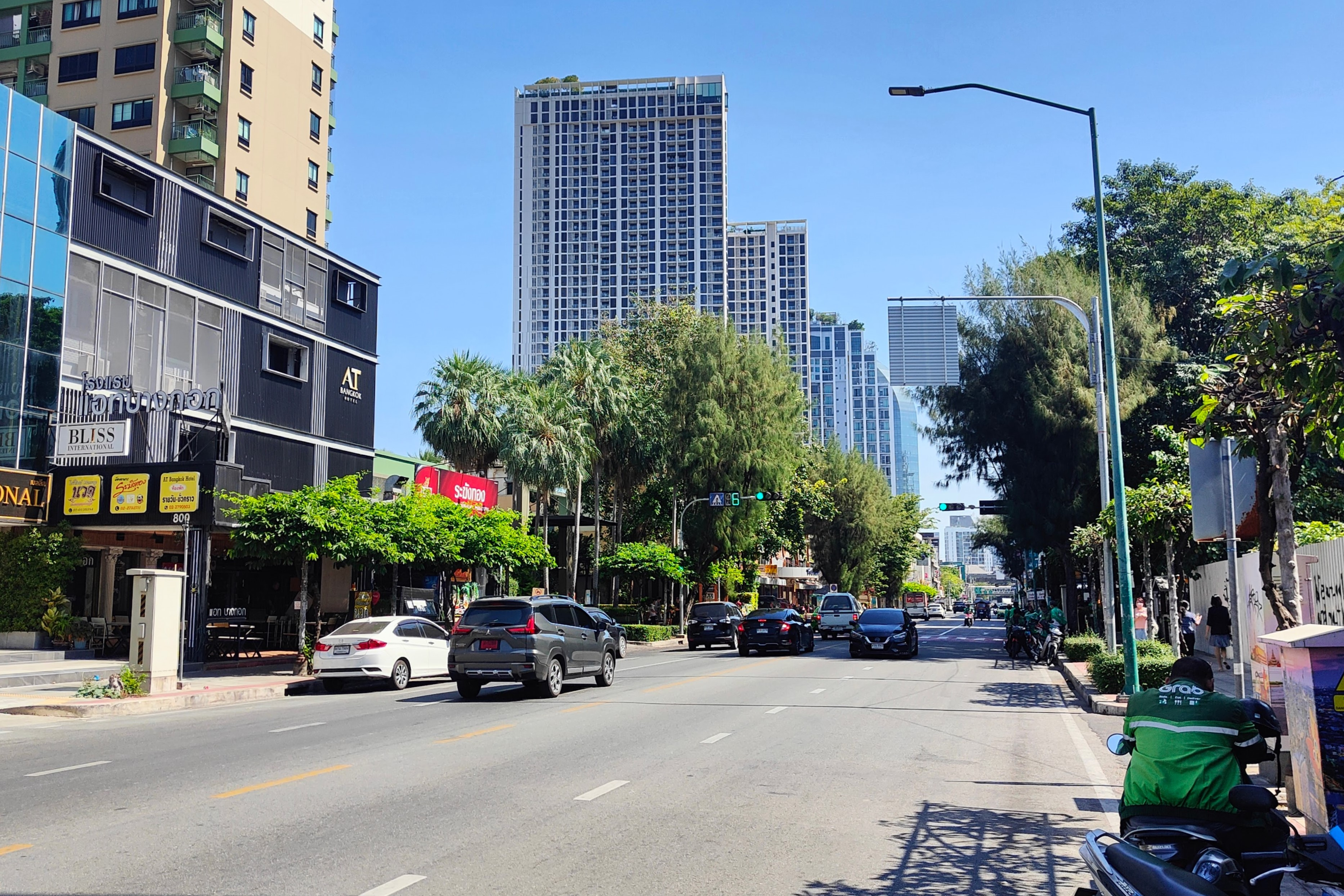
Pradiphat Road looking towards Saphan Khwai

Pradiphat Road (Thai: ถนนประดิพัทธ์, RTGS: Thanon Pradiphat, pronounced [tʰā.nǒn prā.dī.pʰát]) is located in Bangkok, Thailand, mainly within the Phaya Thai sub-district of Phaya Thai district. It is a straight road 1.808 km (1.1 mi) long.

== Route ==
The road begins at the Saphan Daeng intersection in Thanon Nakhon Chai Si sub-district of Dusit district. It intersects Rama V, Techa Wanit, and Thahan Roads, as well as the Saphan Daeng (Daeng Bridge). It continues past the northern railway line (between Sam Sen and Bang Sue stations) at the Thoet Damri intersection, where it crosses Thoet Damri and Kamphaeng Phet 5 Roads. It also crosses the Khlong Prapa (water supply canal) and intersects Rama VI Road beneath the expressway, entering Phaya Thai sub-district within Phaya Thai district. The road ends at Saphan Khwai intersection, connecting with Phahonyothin and Saliratthawiphak Roads.

== History ==
Pradiphat is one of the oldest streets in Bangkok and is classified as a residential area. It was originally named "Phraya Pradiphat Road" (ถนนพระยาประดิพัทธ์) after the nobleman Phraya Patiphat Phuban (Khoyule na Ranong), a nephew of Phraya Ratsadanupradit Mahitsaraphakdi. The road was built through land that once belonged to him.

During the Vietnam War era (1960s to 1970s), the area was particularly lively at night, home to several hotels and pubs catering to American G.I.s, including accommodations for the soldiers. Some of these hotels remain in operation today and are well known for their food. Elizabeth Hotel, for example, is known for its signature rat na, featuring crispy wide rice noodles topped with rich savoury gravy, while across from Pradipat Hotel, there is Abu Ibrahim, a longstanding Indian restaurant that continues to serve the neighbourhood. On the road near Saphan Khwai, the Chaloemsin Cinema once stood as the oldest movie theatre in the area. The building was eventually demolished in September 2016.

On June 24, 1932, at 5:00 am, Phraya Songsuradej met with his fellow conspirators at the intersection near the northern railway line (present-day Thoet Damri intersection) to finalize plans for the Siamese revolution of 1932. His house was located just 200 m (656.2 ft) from the site, near what is now the Government Savings Bank, Pradiphat branch.

== Transport ==
Pradiphat Road is served by bus lines 2-37 (3), 2-42 (44), 3-43 (67), 1-27 (90), 2-15 (97), 2-47 (117), 1-23 (524), and 3-24E (536). The Saphan Khwai BTS station (N7) is approximately 1.84 km (1.1 mi) to the east, while the Kiak Kai pier (N21) of the Chao Phraya Express Boat is about 2.03 km (1.3 mi) to the west.
