= Saphan Khwai =

Coordinates: 13°47′23.20″N 100°32′52.81″E

Saphan Khawi
- สะพานควาย
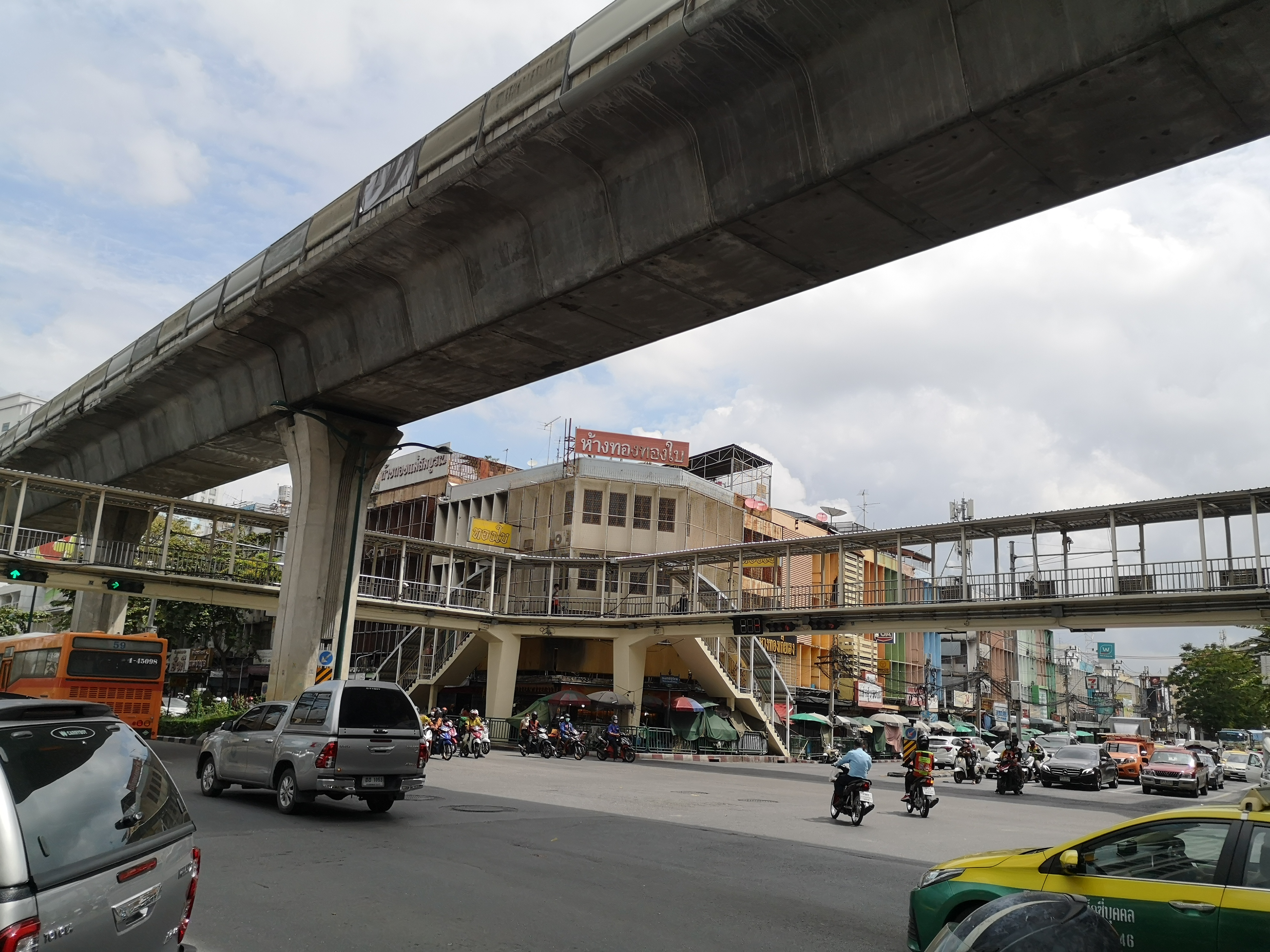
- Saphan Khwai in early 2022
- Interactive map of Saphan Khawi

Location
- Phaya Thai, Bangkok, Thailand
- Roads at junction: Phahon Yothin (north–south); Saliratthawiphak (east); Pradiphat (west)

Construction
- Type: Four-way at-grade intersection with four-way footbridge and BTS tracks

Saphan Khwai (Thai: สะพานควาย, pronounced [sā.pʰāːn kʰwāːj]) is an intersection and neighbourhood in the overlapping areas of Phaya Thai and Sam Sen Nai subdistricts in Phaya Thai District, Bangkok, Thailand.

The surrounding neighbourhood is studded with many apartments and is best known for its many shops and markets. It is served by the BTS skytrain service at Saphan Khwai Station. From the 1960s, as the urban zone of Bangkok grew, the land which once had been countryside, mostly rice farms, became urbanized with more residential and commercial areas.

== Location ==
Saphan Khwai is in the northern zone of Bangkok's central business district at the junction of Phahon Yothin, Pradiphat, Sutthisan Vinitchai, and the short link of Saliratthawiphak Road. It is on the route of the Sukhumvit skytrain line between the Ari and Mo Chit Stations

== History ==
"Khwai" or water buffalo were commonly used for ploughing by Southeast Asian farmers, including Thais. In the past, Saphan Khwai was a farming area on the northern outskirts of Bangkok's core, next to the northern part of Phaya Thai District. It was irrigated by Khlong Sam Sen and Khlong Bang Sue, diverted from the Chao Phraya River. At the beginning of the 19th century, the Saphan Khwai Intersection was the meeting place for rice farmers, buffalo traders, and slaughterhouse workers. Roads at the junction did not meet directly, but a small waterway along Phahonyothin Road carrying irrigation water from Khlong Bang Sue crossed Pradiphat Way. For the convenience of traders, a bridge or "saphan" was built. It was upgraded from wood to concrete as traffic increased.

Until the early 1960s, Saphan Khwai remained a largely rural area. According to a local elderly resident, it was still covered with trees and vegetable gardens. Each night around 8 p.m., herds of bulls would pass through the bridge.

This rural atmosphere lingered well into the early 1980s. A resident of Pradiphat Road recalled that even in 1981, there was still a vacant lot with overgrown grass across from his house, despite the area already developing into a busy commercial district. At that time, the neighbourhood was also home to five cinemas.

In the mid-1990s, a flyover was constructed over the intersection along Phahonyothin Road. It was later dismantled in 1997 to make way for the construction of Saphan Khwai Station.

Today, although the fields, buffalo, and bulls have disappeared, the name "Saphan Khwai" is still used for this area. It means 'buffalo bridge'.

== Transportation ==
- BTS Skytrain: Saphan Khwai Station
- BMTA bus: (Note: As of 2025.) route 2-37 (3), 2-38 (8), 4-38 (28), 1-4 (39), 2-42 (44), 2-44 (54), 63, 74, 3-45 (77), 2-15 (97), 2-47 (117), 2-52 (204), 4-60 (509), 1-19 (510)
