= Daunglan =

Food serving tray in Myanmar

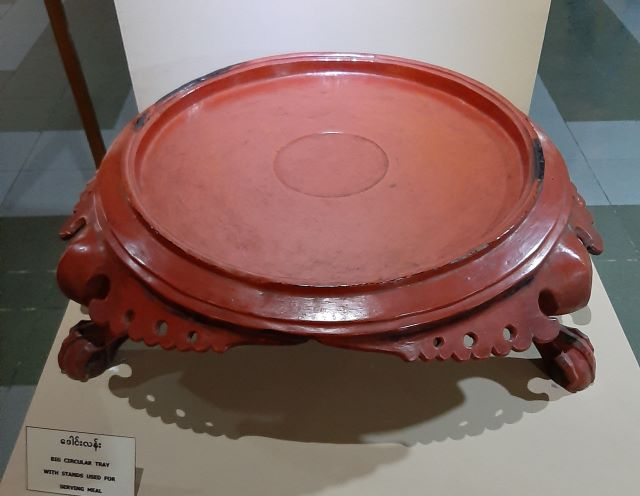
Daunglan

Daunglan (Burmese: ဒေါင်းလန်း; Shan: တွင်းလၢၼ်း) is a circular pedestal tray used to serve meals in Myanmar (Burma), especially in Upper Myanmar. Commonly made of lacquered bamboo, teak or beechwood, the daunglan is served with small bowls consisting of various dishes and soups. It is comparable to the khan tok used in Northern Thailand and Laos.

== See also ==
- Khan tok
- Phan (tray)
