= Kiakkai =

Coordinates: 13°47′50.10″N 100°31′16.85″E

- เกียกกาย
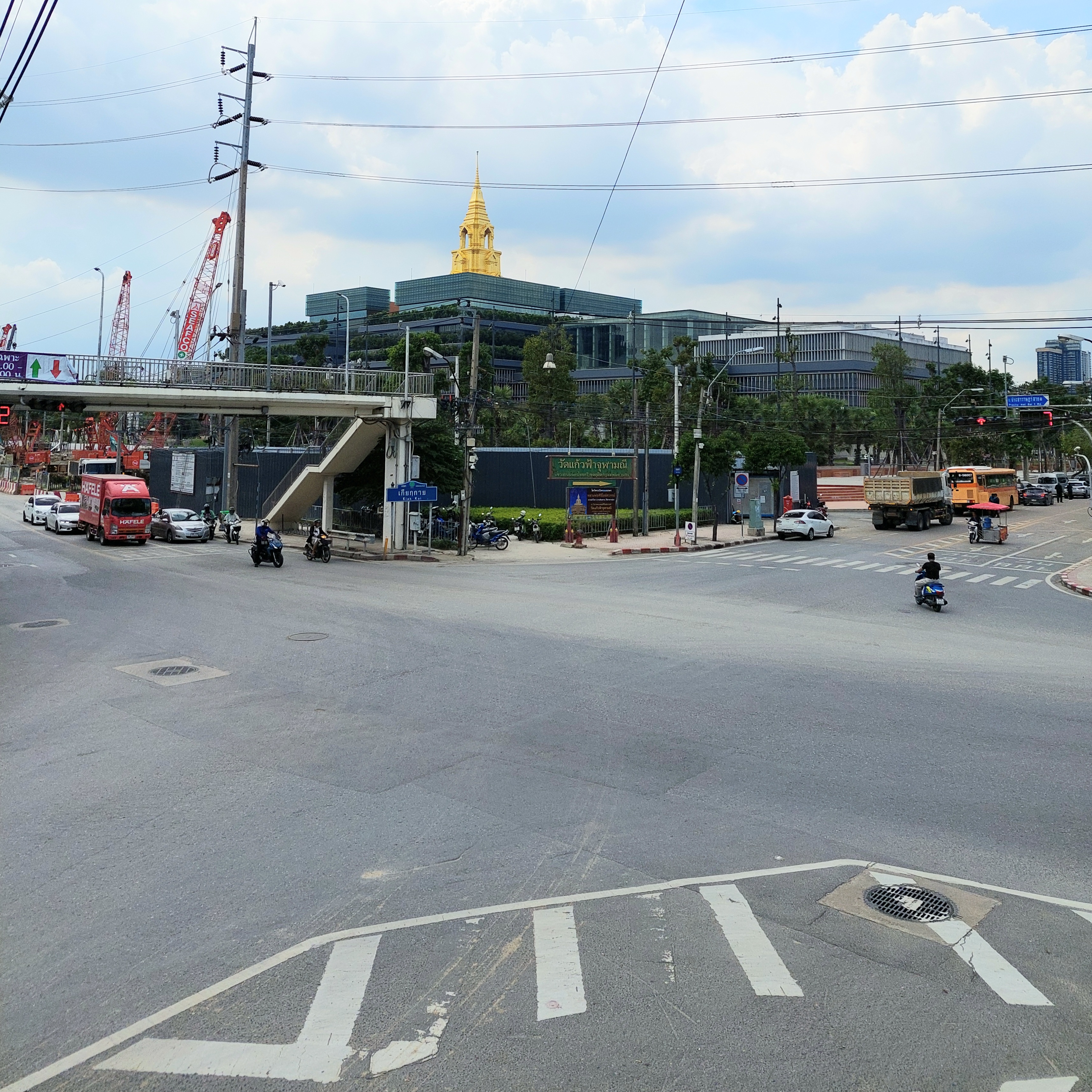
- Kiakkai in October 2023
- Interactive map of Kiakkai

Location
- Thanon Nakhon Chai Si, Dusit, Bangkok, Thailand
- Roads at junction: Pracha Rat Sai 1 (north); Samsen (south); Thahan (east–west)

Construction
- Type: Four-way at-grade intersection

Kiakkai alternatively Kiak Kai (Thai: เกียกกาย, pronounced [kìa̯k.kāːj]) is an intersection and neighbourhood in Bangkok's Thanon Nakhon Chai Si Subdistrict, Dusit District.

The term Kiakkai is an old Thai word meaning "Provisions Department" (comparable to the current Quartermaster Department).

The neighborhood is the site of many Royal Thai Army (RTA) bases: the 1st Cavalry Regiment, King's Guard (กรมทหารม้าที่ 1 รักษาพระองค์); 1st Field Artillery Battalion, King's Guard (กรมทหารปืนใหญ่ที่ 1 รักษาพระองค์); 4th Cavalry Division King's Guard (กองพันทหารม้าที่ 4 รักษาพระองค์); and Military Armoured Vehicle Radio Station (สถานีวิทยุยานเกราะ). Often, these units have supported coups such as the Siamese revolution of 1932, the Thammasat University massacre, the 1981 April rebellion, and the September 9th rebellion.

Kiakkai is home to the Sappaya-Sapasathan, the current Parliament House of Thailand. It is built on the site of the Yothinburana School. There is a megaproject to build the Kiakkai Bridge across the Chao Phraya River, 5.9 km (about 3 mi) long, to Charan Sanitwong Road in Thonburi's Bang Phlat District. The impact from the construction of the bridge caused the three-way footbridge over the intersection to be demolished.
