= Sappaya-Sapasathan =

Parliament building of Thailand

- สัปปายะสภาสถาน
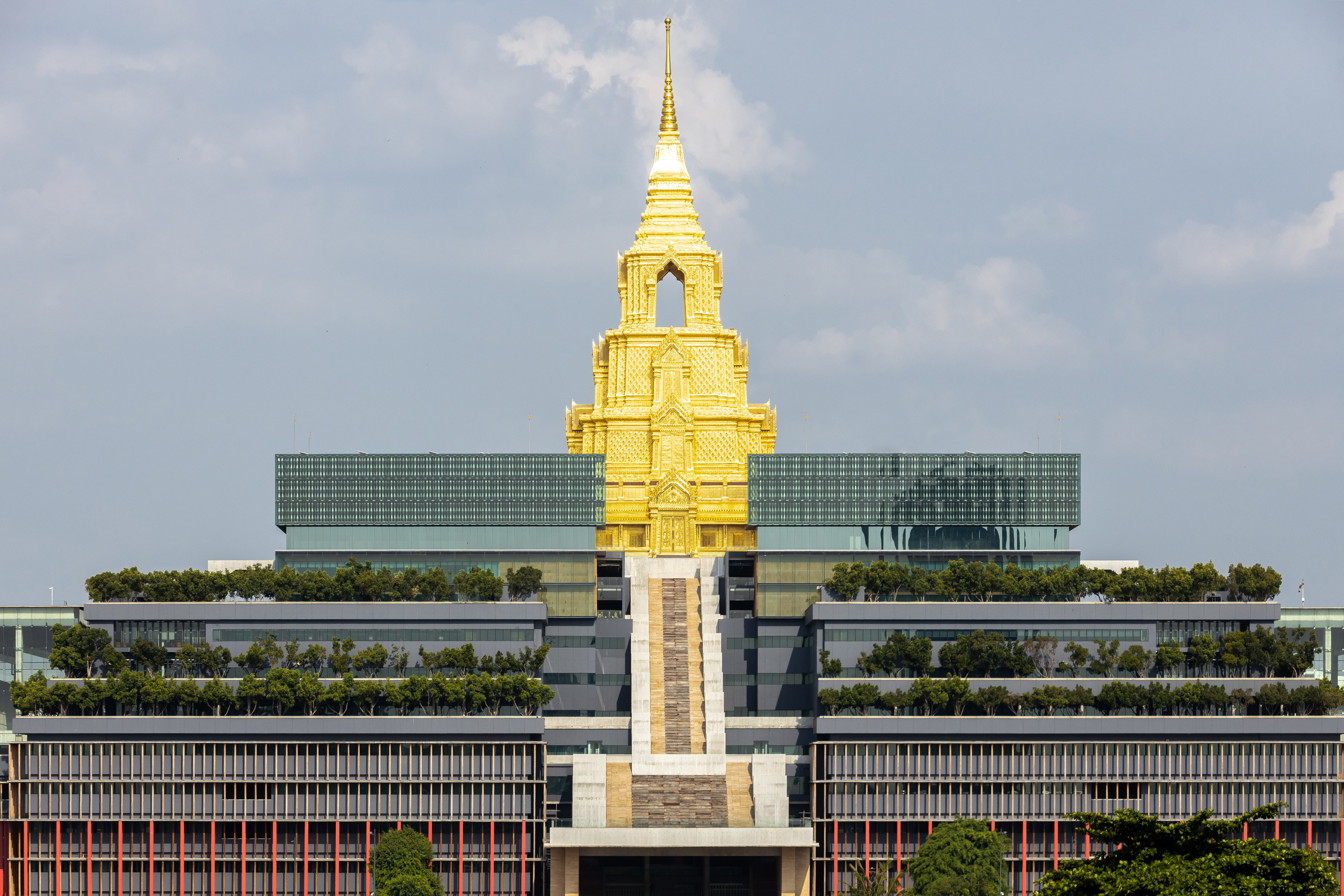
- The "Chulamani Chedi" on the center of Sappaya-Sapasathan in 2023
- Interactive map of the Sappaya-Sapasathan area

General information
- Architectural style: Thai Contemporary
- Location: Kiakkai, Thanon Nakhon Chai Si, Dusit, Bangkok, Thailand
- Coordinates: 13.795823°N 100.517282°E
- Construction started: 8 June 2013
- Completed: 1 May 2021; 5 years ago
- Client: National Assembly (2019–present)

Technical details
- Floor count: 11
- Floor area: 424,000 m^{2}
- Grounds: 300,000 m^{2}

Design and construction
- Architect: Theerapol Niyom

Website
- www.parliament.go.th

Sappaya-Sapasathan (Thai: สัปปายะสภาสถาน, RTGS: Sappayasaphasathan, pronounced [sàp.pāː.já(ʔ).sā.pʰāː.sā.tʰǎːn]) is the third and current meeting place of the National Assembly of Thailand, the bicameral legislative branch of the Government of Thailand. It is located in Bangkok on the east bank of the Chao Phraya River in Kiakkai neighbourhood of the Dusit District. It is the world's largest parliament building with 424,000 m^{2} of floor space.

Once completed, Parliament House MRT station on MRT Purple Line will serve the area.

== History ==
The Thai parliament has changed its venue several times. Its first site was Ananta Samakhom Throne Hall, used from 1933 until 1974. It then moved to the Parliament House of Thailand, but the building was soon outgrown. In 2008, three sites were considered for a new building. They were the Dusit district, the Mueang Nonthaburi district, and the Khlong Toei district. The Dusit district was chosen by the Samak Sundaravej government, resulting in relocation of Yothinburana secondary school and some communities.

== Name ==
There are slightly different interpretations of the building's name.

The title of the winning design was Sappaya Sapha Sathan. The architects who submitted it said that the Buddhist term sappaya means "comfortable in dharma", and the title is supposed to mean "a place for doing good deeds or good karma".

The building's design was inspired by a classic Thai Buddhist tale, Trai Bhum Phra Ruang, and was made to look like a temple as a reminder to officials of "Thainess" and morality, making it truly a Sappaya Sapasathan, "peaceful parliament".

Sappaya-Sapasathan is a word combination with sappaya or the seven of Sappaya, meaning "comfortable", "conducive conditions", "supportive", and the "right thing"; and the word sapasathan, meaning "council of the peaceful".

== Design ==
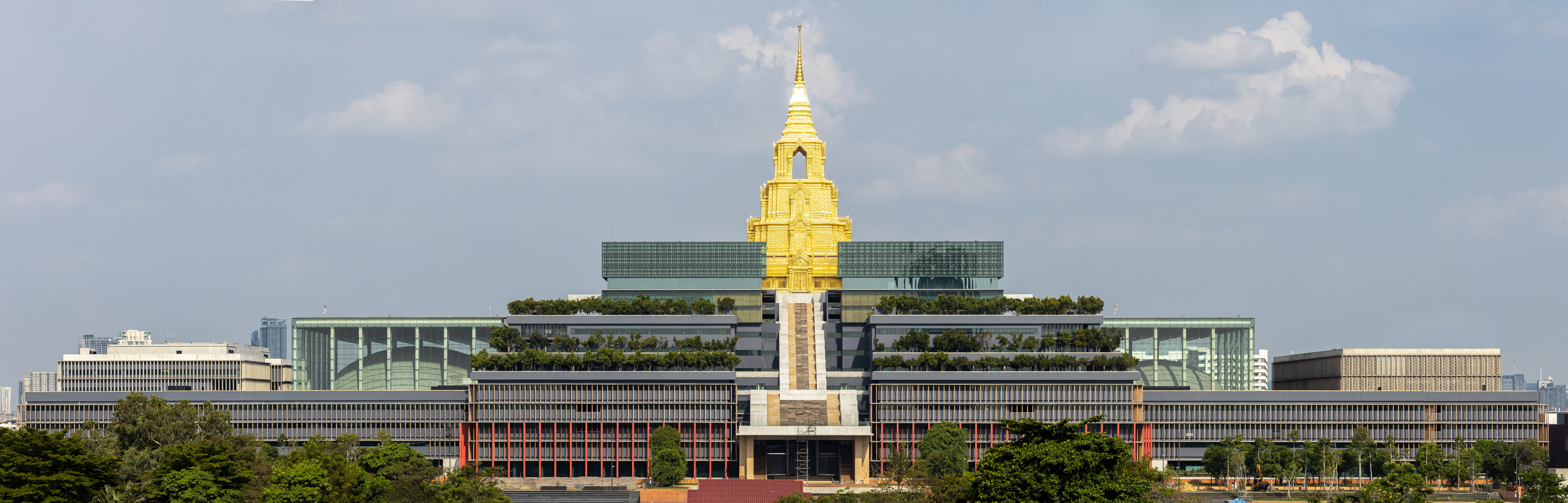
Sappaya-Sapasathan in 2023, viewed from Yanhee Hospital

Sappaya-Sapasathan was designed by a team led by Theerapol Niyom, who was the winner in the building's design competition. Built to provide more than 424,000 m^{2} [4,600,000 square feet] of floor space, at a budget of approximately 23 billion baht, it can accommodate more than 5,000 people and parking for 2,000 cars. Its main features are a Thai pagoda in the center of the building, Surya Hall (Hall of the Sun) for House of Representative, Chandra Hall (Hall of the Moon) for Senate of Thailand, and the use of 5,018 teak trees as they represent the "DNA of Thailand".

It also houses museums, a convention center, a seminar room, a banquet hall, and offices. The design has been criticised for being "religious architecture", embracing "elements of Buddhist and Hindu cosmology".

== Construction ==
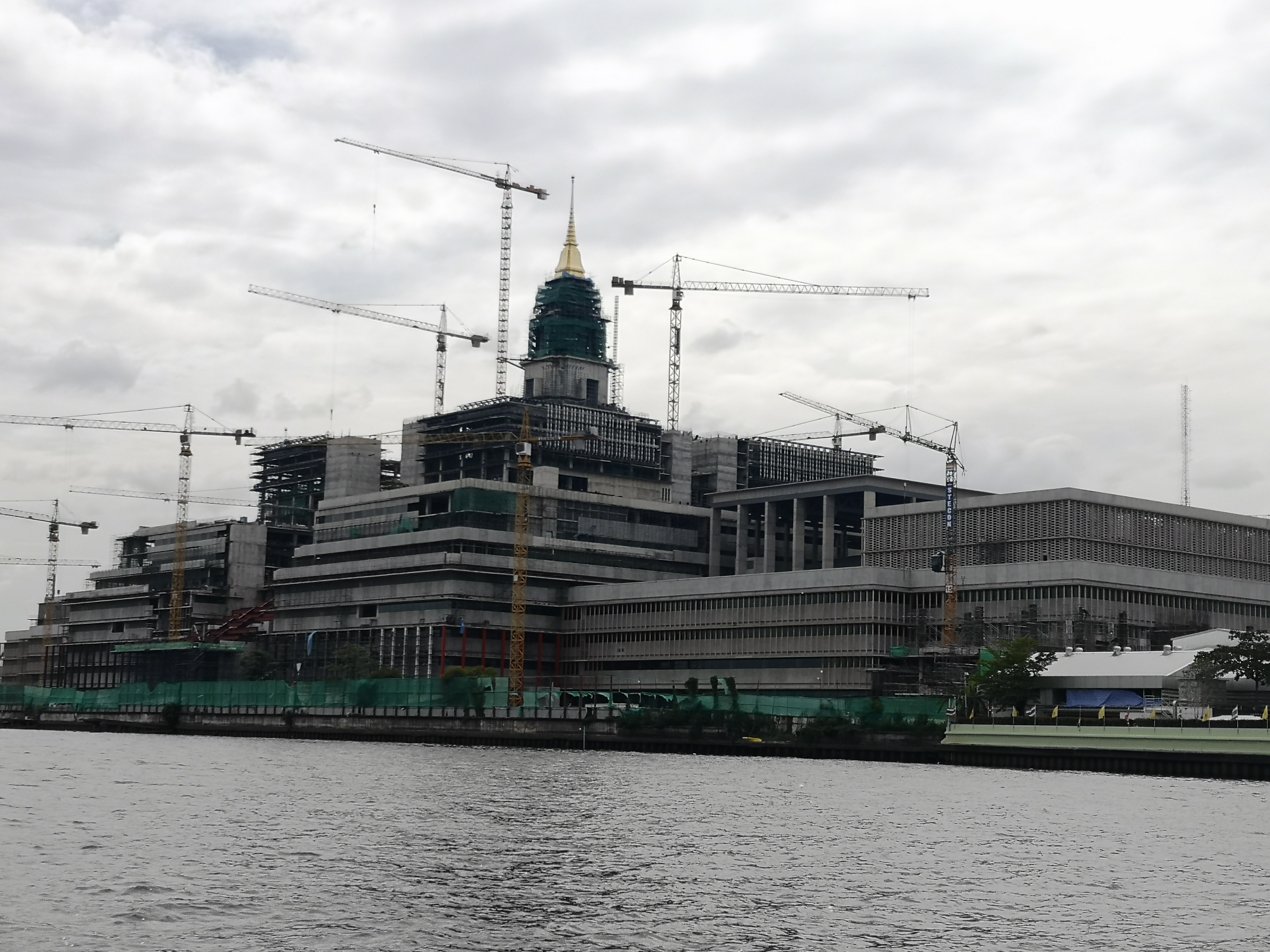
Sappaya-Sapasathan during construction in July 2019

It was contracted for in 2013 and was scheduled to be opened in 2015. It sits on a bank of the Chao Phraya River in Kiakkai neighbourhood of the Thanon Nakhon Chai Si Subdistrict, Dusit District, occupying 300,000 m^{2} of land. The site of the previous parliament building was returned to its owner, the Bureau of the Royal Household, at the end of 2018. Construction of the new building has been delayed for four years. The project budget has ballooned from 14 billion baht to 23 billion baht. Parliament has levied no penalties on the developer for missing the deadline. As the land where the old parliament building sits was already returned to the Crown Property Bureau, Parliament met in an auditorium rented from telecom firm TOT at a cost of 11 million baht per month from May 2019.

Since August 2019, Parliament now meets in Sappaya-Sapasathan, although parts of the building remained unfinished. The building was officially opened on 1 May 2021 after significant delays.

== Gallery ==
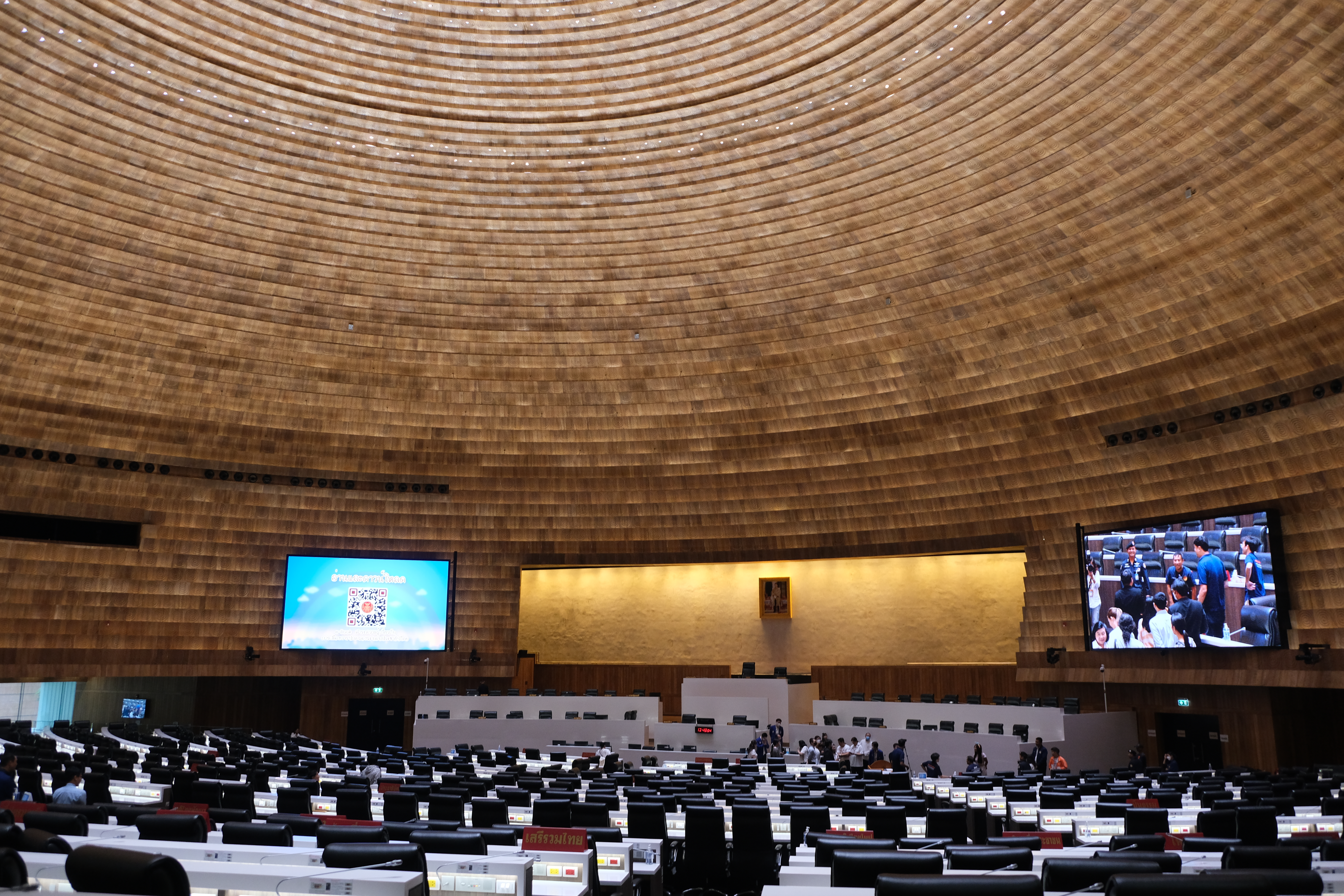
Phra Suriyan Chamber

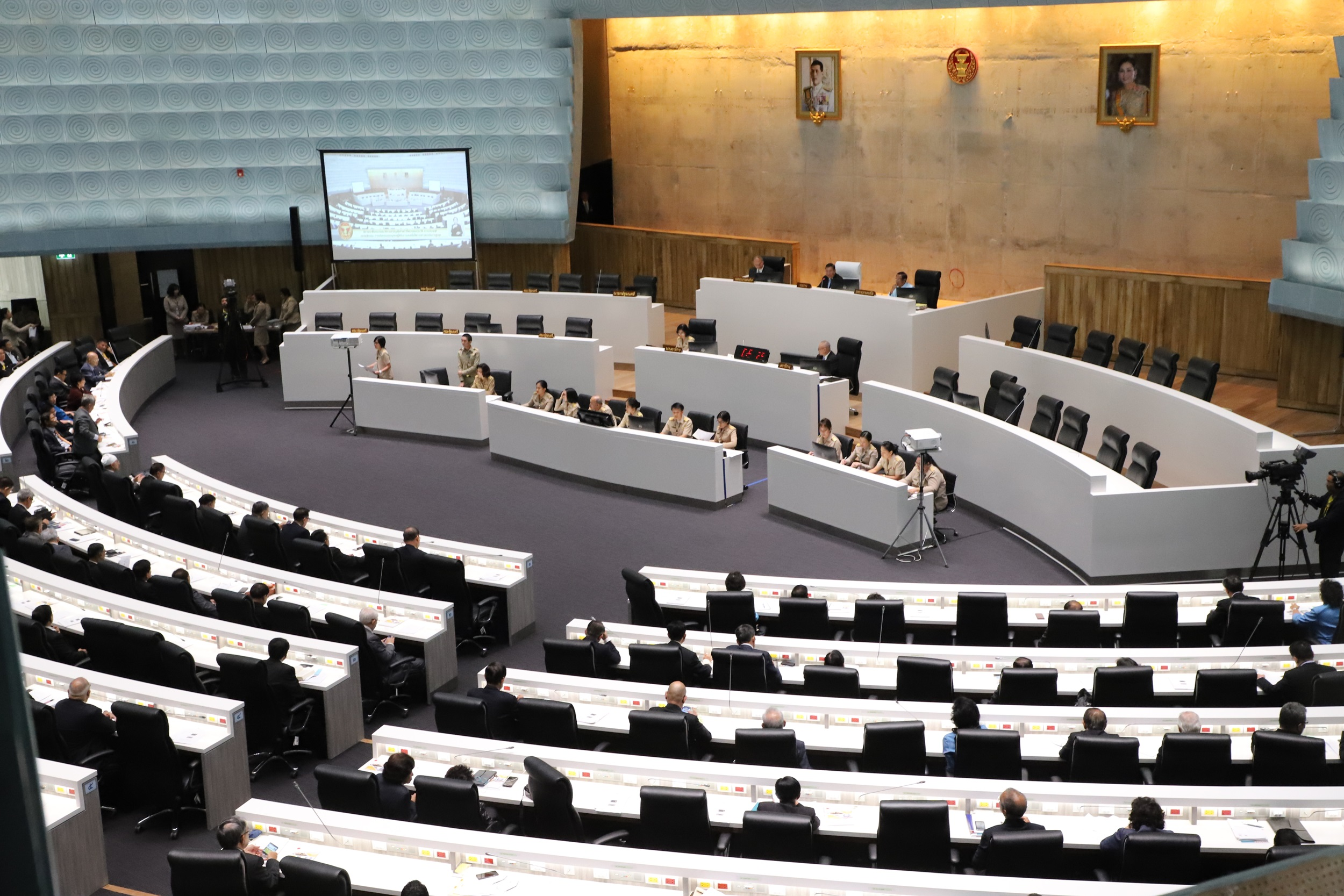
Chantra Chamber

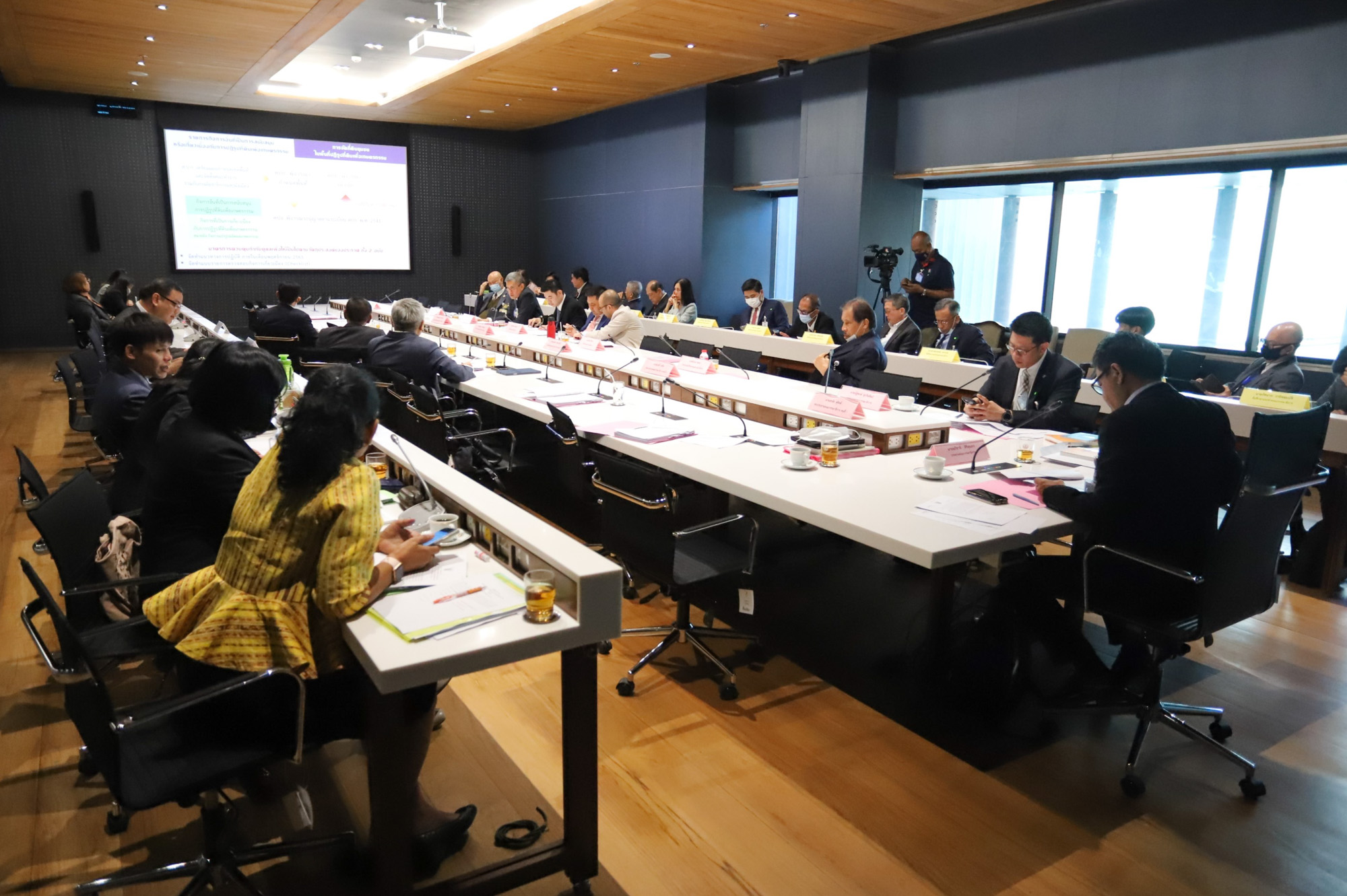
Committee meeting room

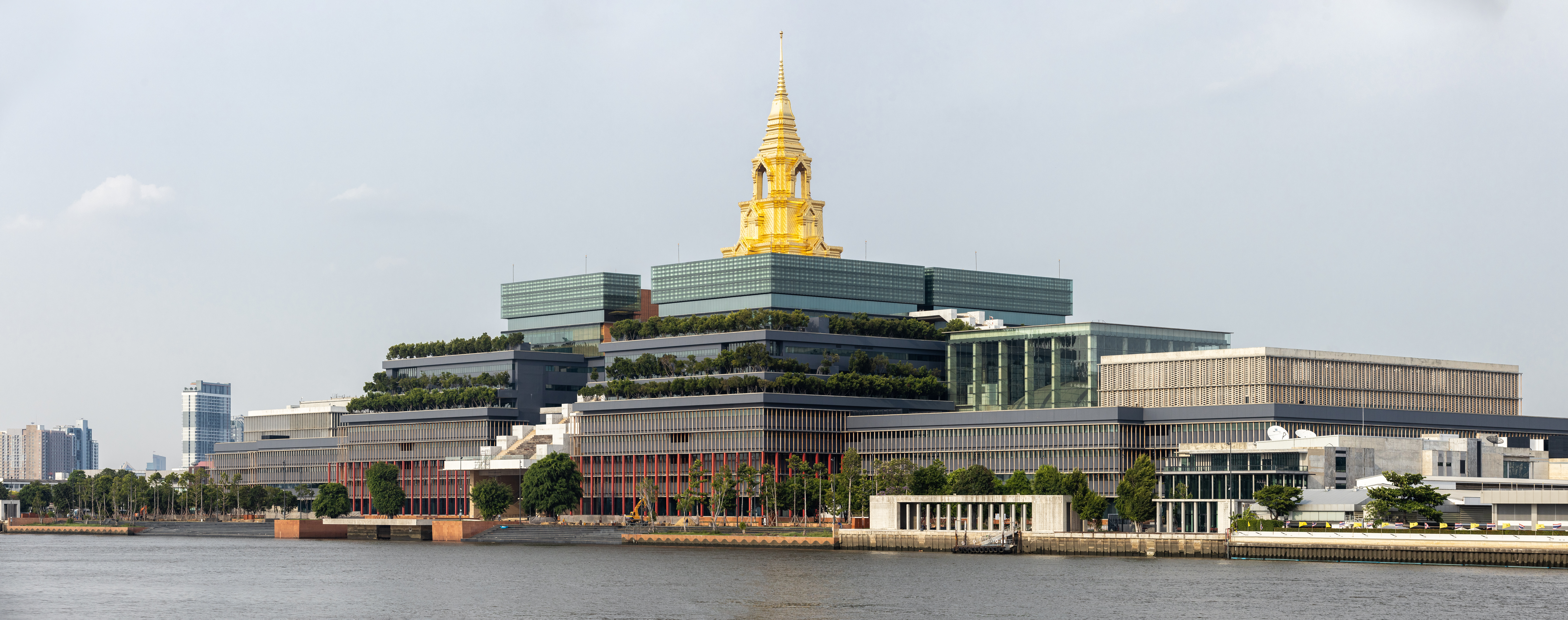
View of Sappaya-Sapasathan from Chao Phraya River

== See also ==
- National Assembly of Thailand – legislature of Thailand
  - Senate of Thailand
  - House of Representatives of Thailand
- Ananta Samakhom Throne Hall – previous home of the National Assembly (1933–1974)
- Parliament House of Thailand – previous home of the National Assembly (1974–2018)
- Government House of Thailand – home of the executive branch of the Royal Thai Government
