= Khantok =

Pedestal tray used as a dining table

Typical ratten khantok used in households, pictured here sold in Chiang Rai

Dishes served on a ratten khantok at a Thai fusion restaurant in Chiang Mai

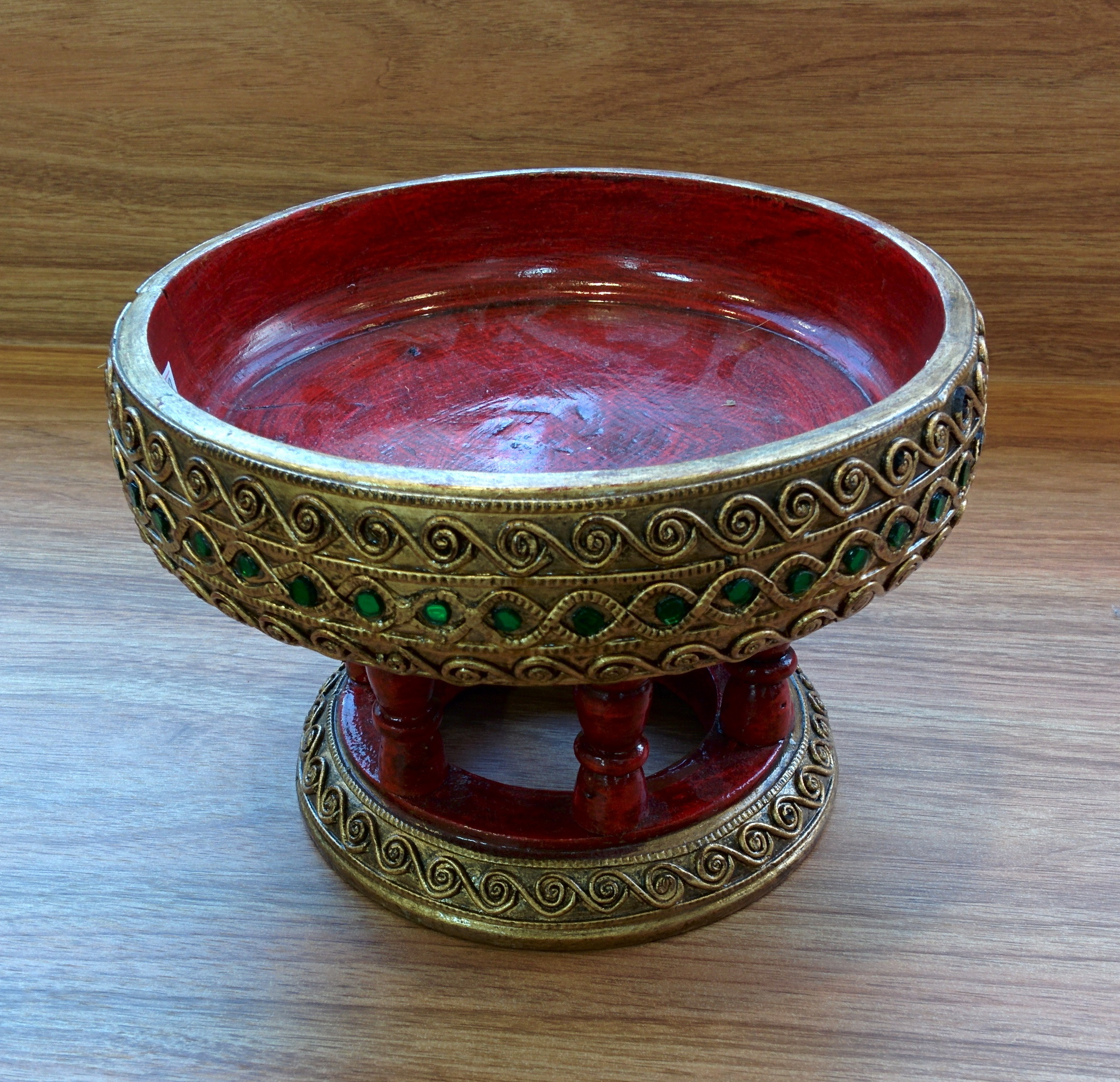
A small wooden khantok, usually used ceremonially

A khantok (Northern Thai: ᨡᩢ᩠ᨶᨲᩰ᩠ᨠ, pronounced [kʰantoːk]; Thai: ขันโตก, pronounced [kʰǎn.tòːk], also romanized as khantoke), tok (Northern Thai: ᨲᩰ᩠ᨠ, pronounced [toːk]; Thai: โตก, pronounced [tòːk]) or phatok Lao: ພາໂຕກ, pronounced [pʰáː.tȍːk]; Northeastern Thai: พาโตก, pronounced [pʰâː.tòːk]) is a pedestal tray used as a small dining table by the Lanna people (of northern Thailand), Laotians, and by people from Isan (northeastern Thailand). A khantoke tray is a short, round table, made of several different materials such as: wood, bamboo or rattan. It has a diameter of about 35 centimetres (14 in) but can vary in size and use case. It is comparable to the daunglan traditionally used in Burmese cuisine.

== Culture ==
Glutinous rice is generally eaten instead of "fluffy" rice in this culture, which is eaten in the rest of Thailand. Glutinous rice (Oryza sativa var. glutinosa; also called "sticky rice", "sweet rice", or "waxy rice" Thai people call it "Khao Neaw") is grown mainly in Southeast and East Asia. It has opaque grains, very low amylose content and is sticky when cooked. It is called glutinous in the sense of being glue-like or sticky, and not in the sense of containing gluten. While often called "sticky rice", it differs from non-glutinous strains of japonica rice that also become sticky to some degree when cooked. Numerous cultivars of glutinous rice exist, including japonica, indica and tropical japonica strains.

A khantoke can hold cups of rice and other food, flowers, and candles and fruit.

== Dining ==
People in northern Thailand traditionally sit on the floor when eating. When the food is ready, it is poured into cups or bowls and placed on the khantoke tray. Then it is ready to be served.

Khantoke is used as dining furniture to keep food off the ground at special occasions such as wedding parties, funerals, housewarming parties and temple festivals.

Khantoke dinners involve different foods depending on social status. Khantoke dinners are a northern tradition, especially in Chiang Mai, Chiang Rai, Lamphun, and Lampang. The tradition of hosting traditional khanthoke dinners was initiated by Kraisi Nimmanhemin in 1906.

== Ceremonial use ==
A location is prepared for the guests by providing them with a seat and table.

- A fence is built with bamboo to shield the event. They are joined together and coconut leaves split down the middle, hunched like Pratupa.
- Banana or sugar canes are strapped down in a maze-like circle.
- Holy thread is used to encircle it (if it is a more important ceremony).
- A pitcher is set within a chamber, along with a clubbed Issy penny on cigarettes and tea leaves.
- A lamp is created by using wax or candle to encircle it.
- The band includes salo, flute and drums.
- Jasmine is brought to the host, who in turn gives it to guests as they arrive.

== See also ==
- Phan (tray)
- Daunglan
