= Phan (tray) =

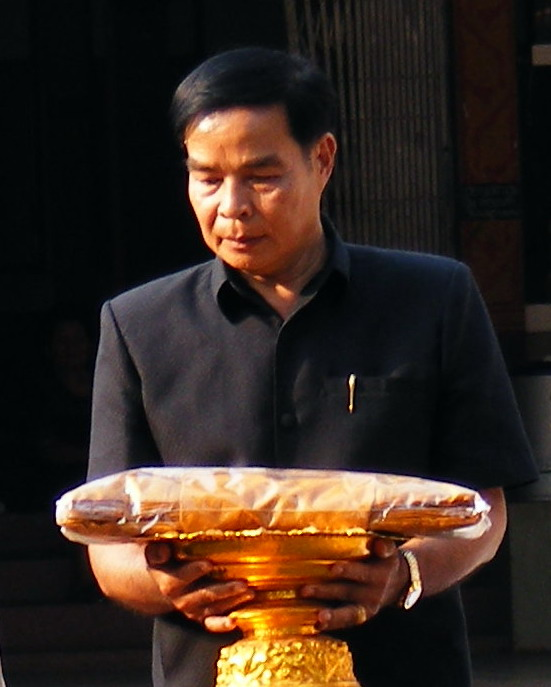
A man holding a phan with the outer robe of a Buddhist monk during a cremation in Wat Khung Taphao, Ban Khung Taphao, Uttaradit Province, Thailand.

Phan (Thai: พาน, pronounced [pʰāːn]) is an artistically decorated tray with pedestal. It is common in Thailand, Cambodia, and Laos.

== Description ==
A phan is normally round and comes in different sizes. The usual measures range between a diameter of 20 cm to about 50 cm. It is more or less deep.

Phans are usually made of metal such as copper, silver, brass, or steel. Nowadays aluminum or gilded plastic is generally used, which makes the phan lighter. This is convenient, for sometimes they have to be carried for a long time.

== Tradition ==
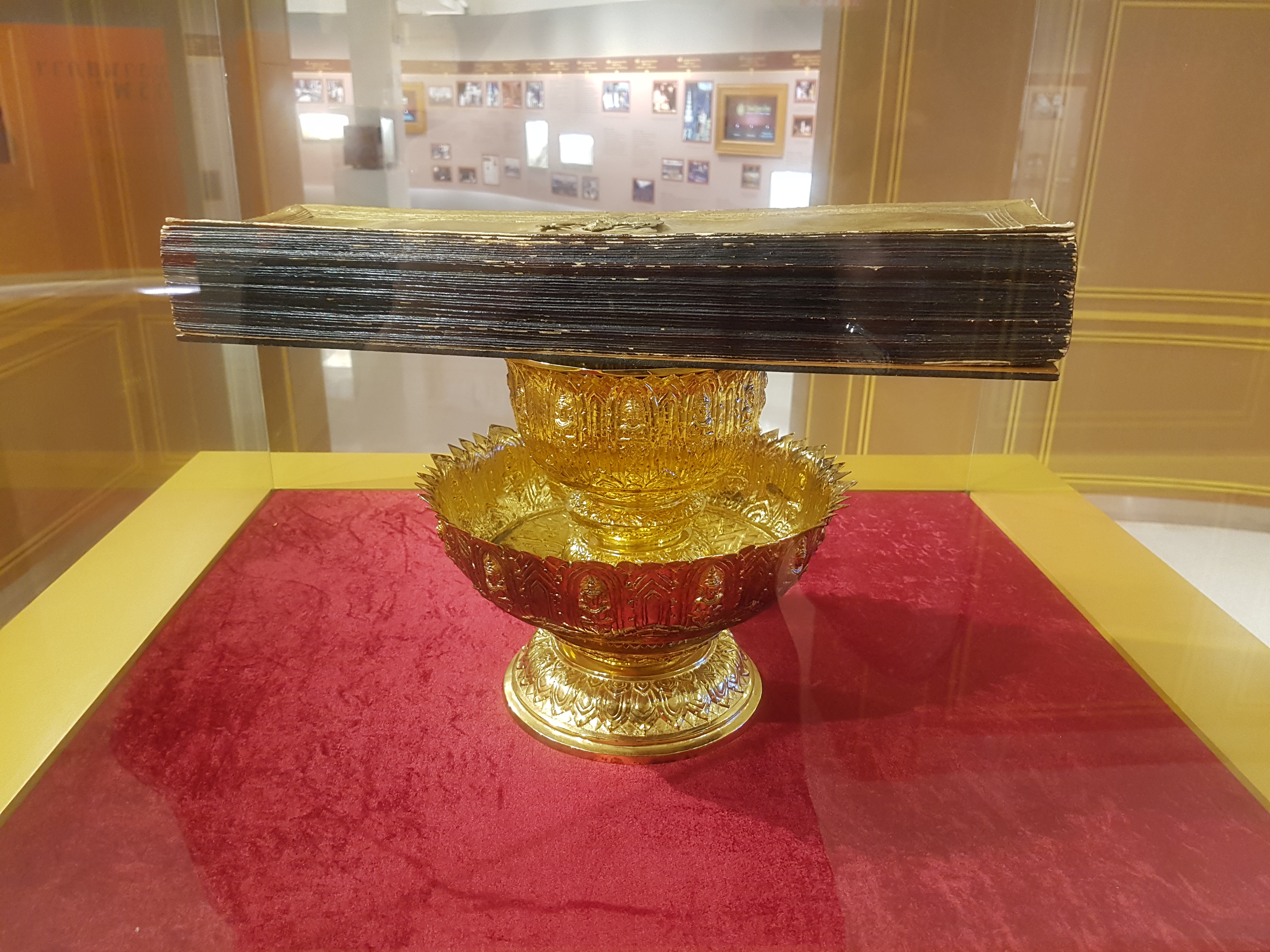
The Thai constitution of 1932, placed on a two-tiered phan, displayed at the Thai Parliament Museum.

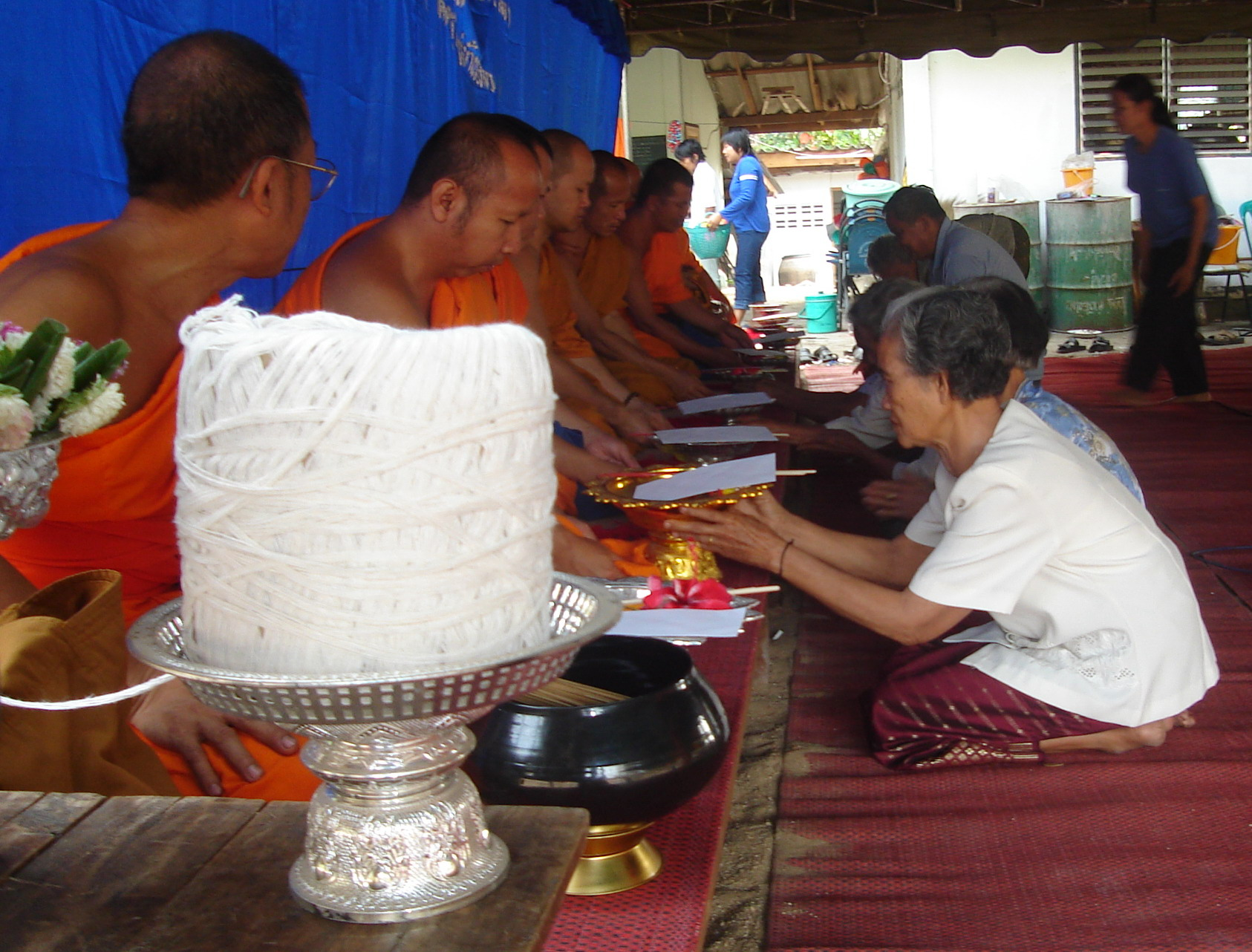
A phan in the forefront.

The phan trays are traditionally very important in Thai culture, Cambodian culture, and Lao culture. Phans are generally used for ritual devotional practices and offerings may be placed on phans by the shrines. Phans are also used for containing other highly important things, including legal documents such as the constitution, or offerings to royalty.

Phans are also used to bring the items of the Buddhist ceremony for young men who are to be ordained as monks, like robes, incense, candles and a pillow, among other items. In this case the family first displays all the items in the house, and then family members bring the items on decorated phans from the home to the temple. They are also used in traditional marriage ceremonies, especially in variants of the groom's parade to the bridal house to carrying symbolic offerings for the bride's dowry.

Formerly, when the chewing of areca nut and betel was common among Thai, Lao, and Khmer people, the ingredients for chewing, (including the nuts, leaves, spices and instruments for cutting) were presented on a phan to the guest entering the house as part of a traditional welcoming ceremony.

In the story of the "Seven Nang Songkrans", Thao Kabinlaphrom, a mythical being, had to cut off his own head to perform a ceremonial salute to Thammaban Kuman. The problem was that if his head fell to the earth, it would scorch it. If it went up into the air, there would be no rain, and if it fell into the sea, the waters would dry up. So he decided to order his daughter to bring a phan, where he would place his head after having cut it off. Thus she could carry the head in a ritual procession across the heavens around Khao Phra Sumen (Mount Sumeru), following which she would keep it in a cave in Khao Krailat (Mount Kailash). This ceremony would be performed yearly by one of the seven daughters in turn, the Nang Songkrans.

== Other ==
- "พอ พาน", (pho phan) is also used as an illustration in order to name the letter พ, the 30th consonant of the Thai alphabet, according to the traditional letter symbols Thai children use to memorize the alphabet.
- The Phu Phan Mountains (Thai: ทิวเขาภูพาน) are named after this tray because their silhouette is flat on the top.
- A two-tiered phan appears in the centre of the Royal Arms of Cambodia

== See also ==
- Culture of Thailand
- Khan tok
