= Kiakkai Bridge =

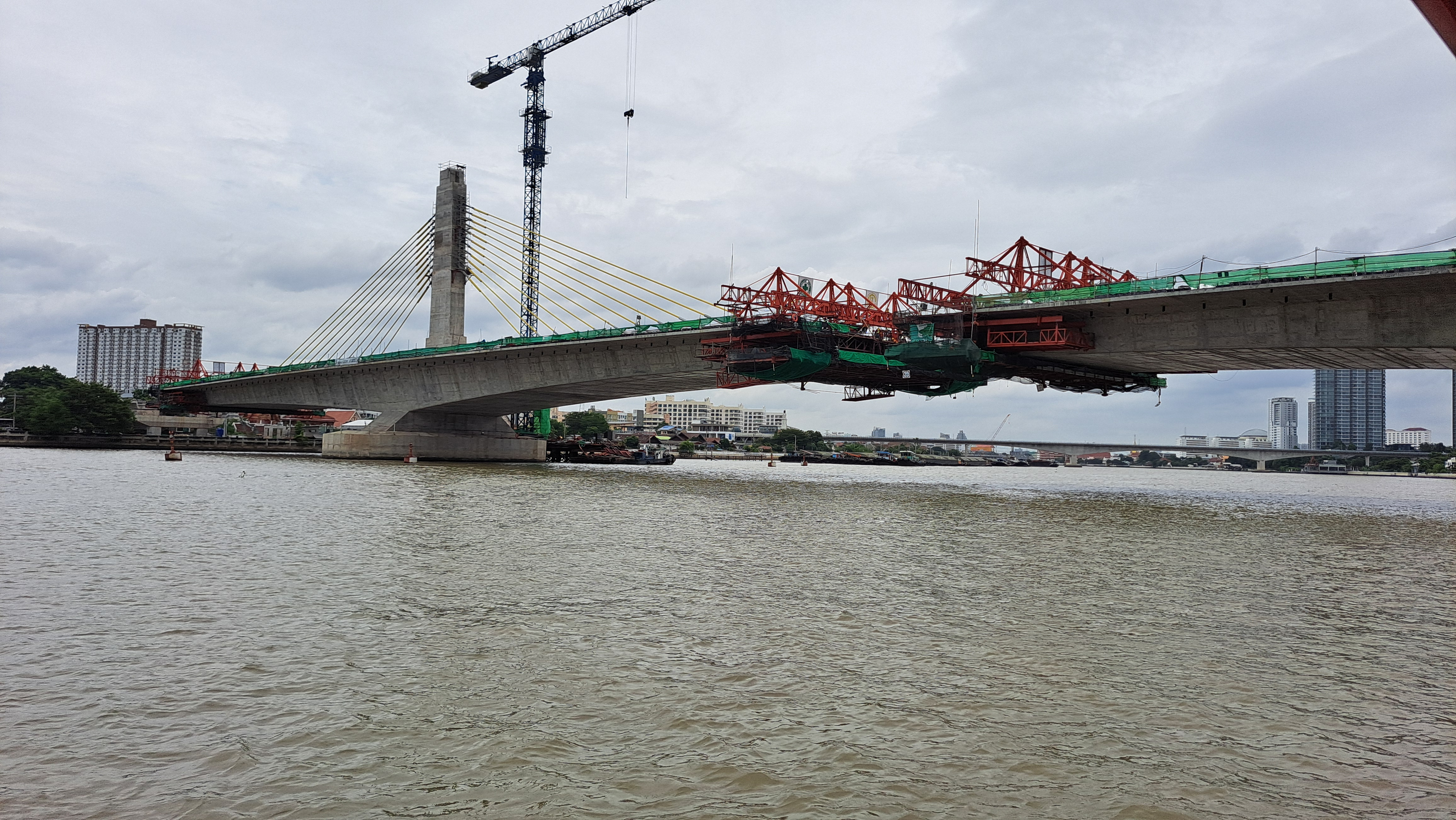
- Kiakkai Bridge viewed from the south
- Coordinates: 13°47′58″N 100°30′57″E
- Crosses: Chao Phraya River
- Locale: Bangkok, Thailand

Characteristics
- Design: Extradosed bridge

Location
- Interactive map of Kiakkai Bridge

The Kiakkai Bridge is an under-construction extradosed bridge crossing the Chao Phraya River in Kiakkai, Thanon Nakhon Chai Si Subdistrict, Dusit District, Bangkok, Thailand.

The part of the bridge that crosses the river will be 165 meters. With access roadways on either side, the total length will be 320 metres. The crossing will have two lanes in each direction.

Construction will involve the creation of an elevated road that will connect bridge on the west side of the Chao Phraya River connecting to Charan Sanit Wong Rd.

Construction will involve the creation of an elevated road linking the bridge to Charan Sanit Wong Road on the west side of the Chao Phraya River. On the east side, access ramps will be built and the bridge will connect to Thahan Road and the intersection at Saphan Daeng.

The total cost is expected to be $475.6 million with a planned completion date of 2026. The project is under the management of the Bangkok Metropolitan Administration (BMA).
