= Thai Parliament Museum =

- พิพิธภัณฑ์รัฐสภา
- Established: 1974
- Location: Sappaya-Sapasathan, Thanon Nakhon Chai Si, Dusit, Bangkok, Thailand
- Type: Political history museum
- Public transit access: BMTA: 12, 18, 28, 70, 108, AC 539, AC 542, AC 515
- Website: Official website

The Thai Parliament Museum (Thai: พิพิธภัณฑ์รัฐสภา) is a museum within the Sappaya-Sapasathan, Bangkok, dedicated to the political history of Thailand after the transition to a constitutional monarchy in 1932.

== History ==
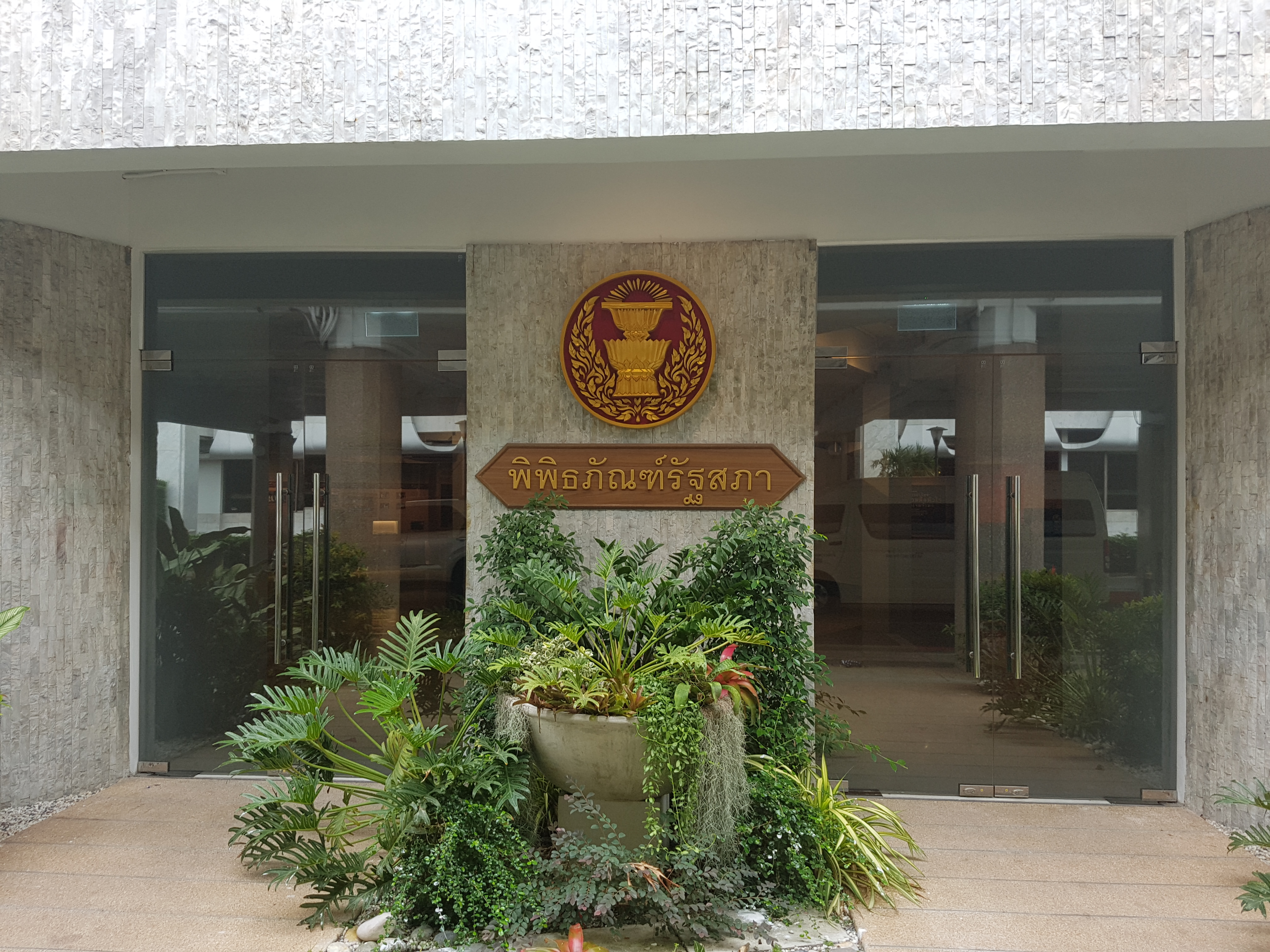
Old Parliament Museum at Parliament House

The museum was established and first opened to the public in 1974 as part of the Document and Research Service Centre (ศูนย์บริการเอกสารและค้นคว้า) of the Secretariat of the House of Representatives. At that time, the museum was housed by Building A (ตึกเอ) within the Parliament House, sharing the location with the Thai Parliament Library.

In 1976, the museum was expected to be moved to the Ananta Samakhom Throne Hall, a former parliament house, but this was prevented by the ongoing refurbishment of the hall.

In 1978, the museum was relocated to Building B (ตึกบี) in the Parliament House instead.

In 1980, a statue of King Rama VII was erected in front of Parliamentary Building 1 (อาคารรัฐสภา 1) of the Parliament House, and a chamber was created behind the statue as a museum for displaying personal belongings of the king, called the King Prajadhipok Museum, inaugurated on 10 December 1980.

In 1984, Ukrit Mongkolanawin, then president of the parliament, reintroduced the idea of moving the Parliament Museum to the Ananta Samakhom Throne Hall. After the renovation of the throne hall, the museum was located there for a period of time from 10 December 1984 and was moved back to the Parliament House, where it was housed in the same chamber as the King Prajadhipok Museum.

In 1998, the King Prajadhipok Museum moved out to a new building on Lan Luang Road near Phan Fa Lilat Bridge. The chamber has since housed the Parliament Museum only.

In 2019, Thai Parliament Museum moved to latest parliament house building, Sappaya-Sapasathan.

== Governance ==
The museum is administered by the Museum and Archives Division (กลุ่มงานพิพิธภัณฑ์และจดหมายเหตุ), an agency of the Bureau of Academic Services (สำนักวิชาการ), Secretariat of the House of Representatives.

== Location and travel ==
The museum is located in a chamber behind the statue of King Rama VII at Parliamentary Building 1 (อาคารรัฐสภา 1), Parliament House of Thailand, U-Thong Nai Road, Dusit District, Bangkok, opposite to the Dusit Zoo.

The museum can be accessed by the BMTA buses Nos. 12, 18, 28, 70, 108, AC 539, AC 542, and AC 515.

== Opening hours and entry ==
The museum is open from Monday to Friday, 09:00–16:00 hours, except on public holidays.

It is open to the public without charge.

== Exhibition ==
The exhibition at the museum is divided into five sections:

- Section 1 displays the life of King Rama VII
- Section 2 displays the history of the Siamese revolution of 1932 in which the government of the country was changed from absolute monarchy to constitutional monarchy
- Section 3 displays the original copies of the constitutions of Thailand
- Section 4 displays historical sessions of the parliament
- Section 5 displays cooperation and relationships between the Thai and foreign parliaments

Some of the historical documents displayed at the museum

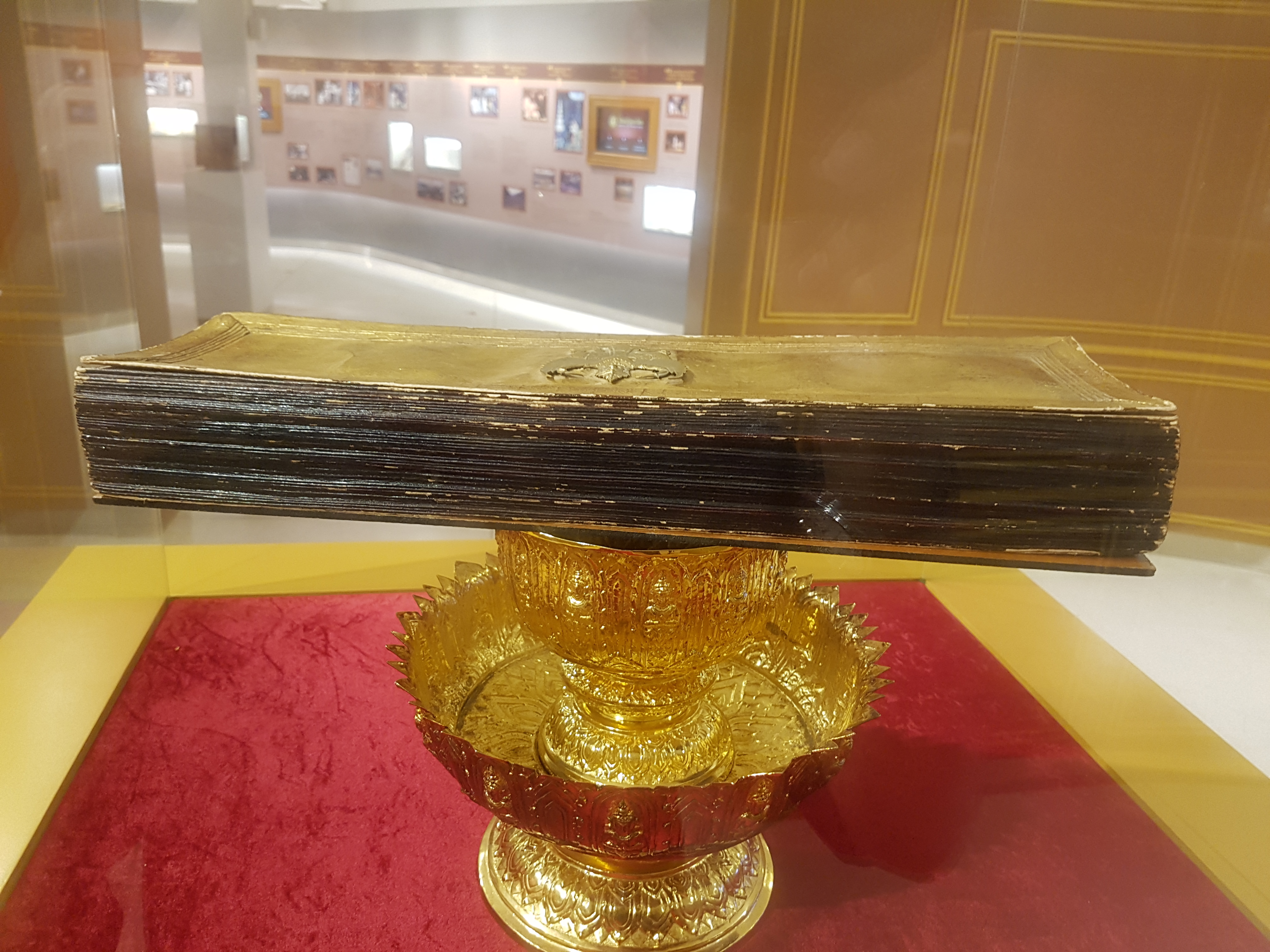
Original copy of 1932 constitution

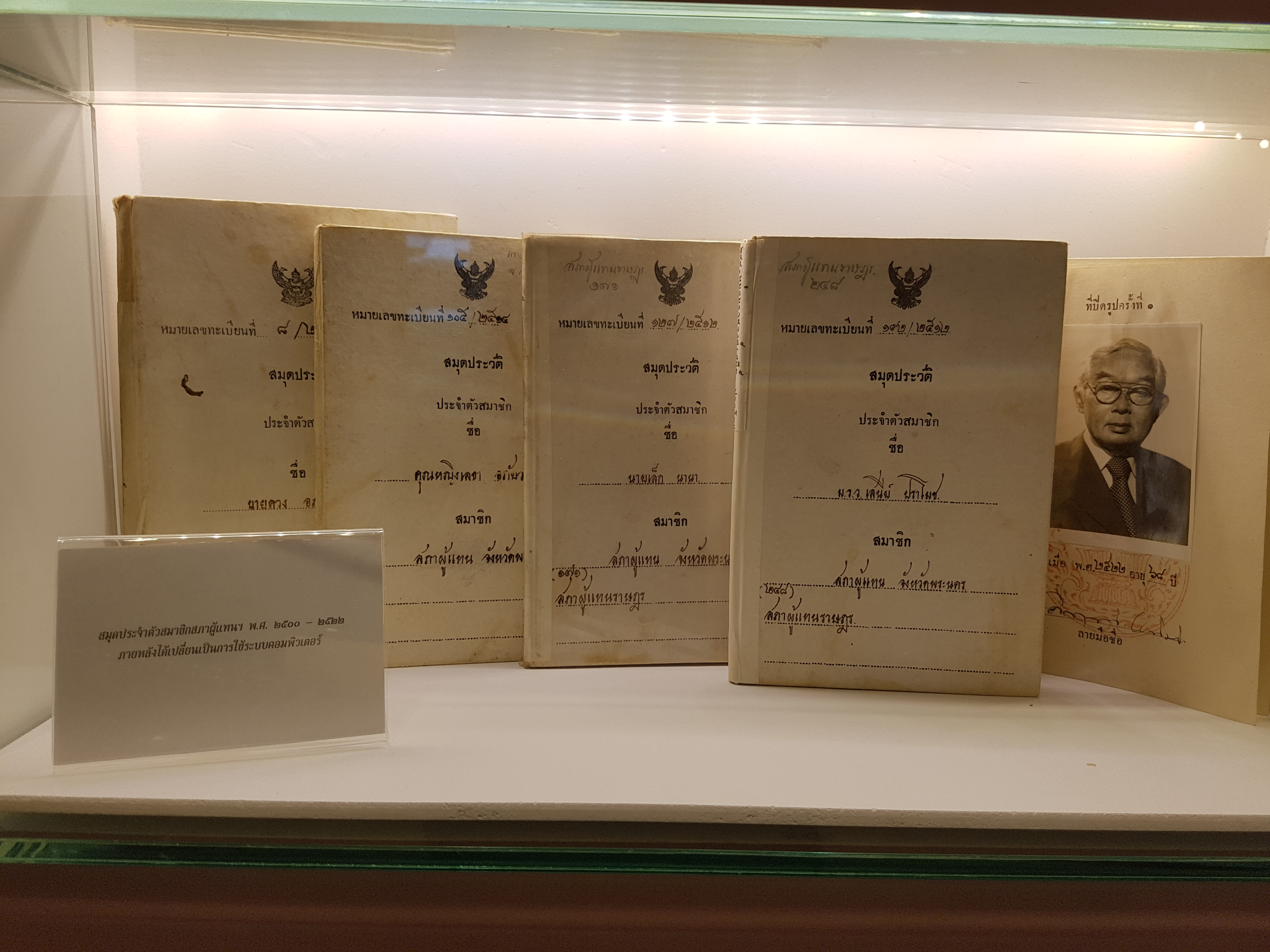
Historical MP identity papers

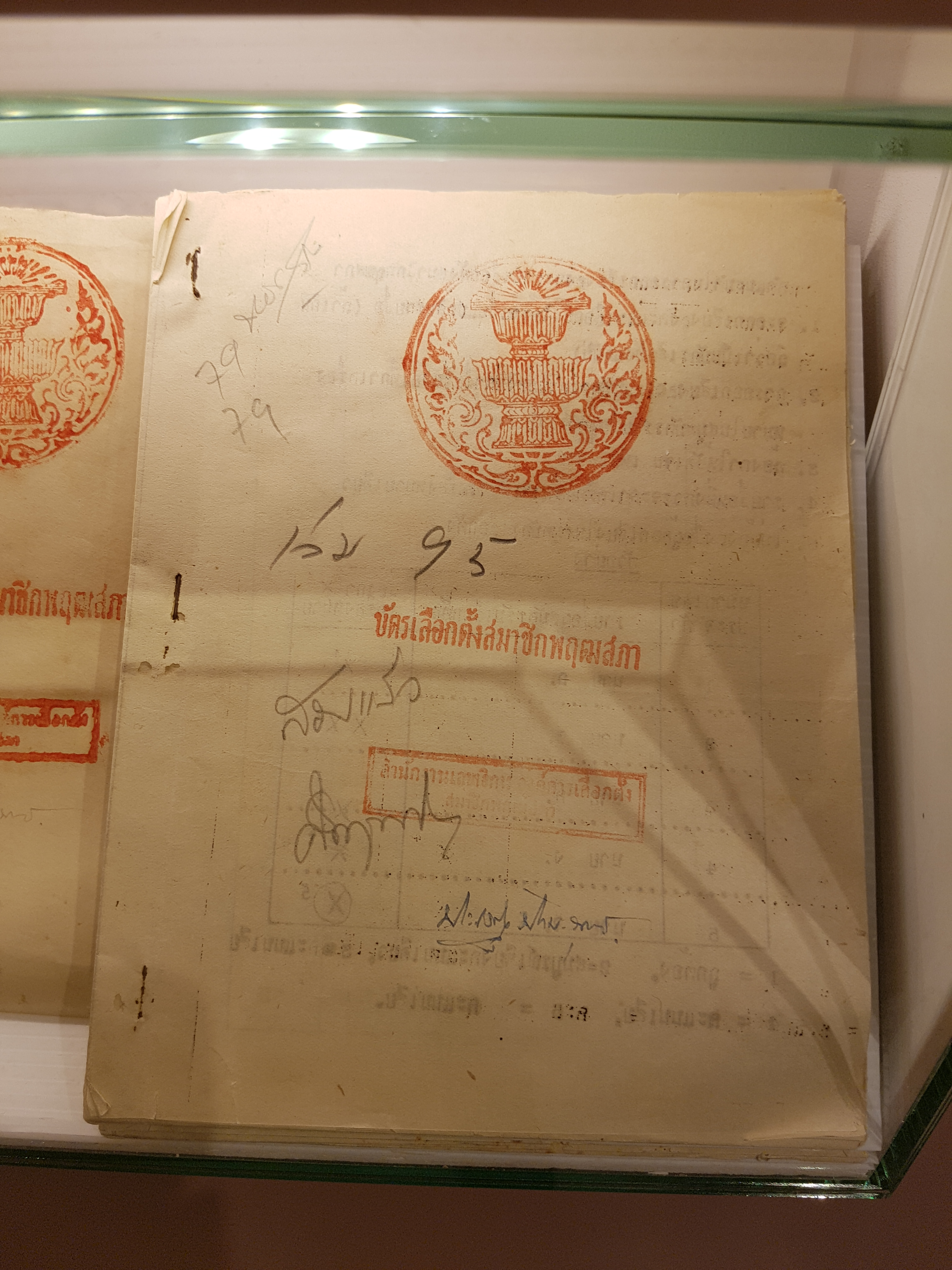
Historical ballot papers

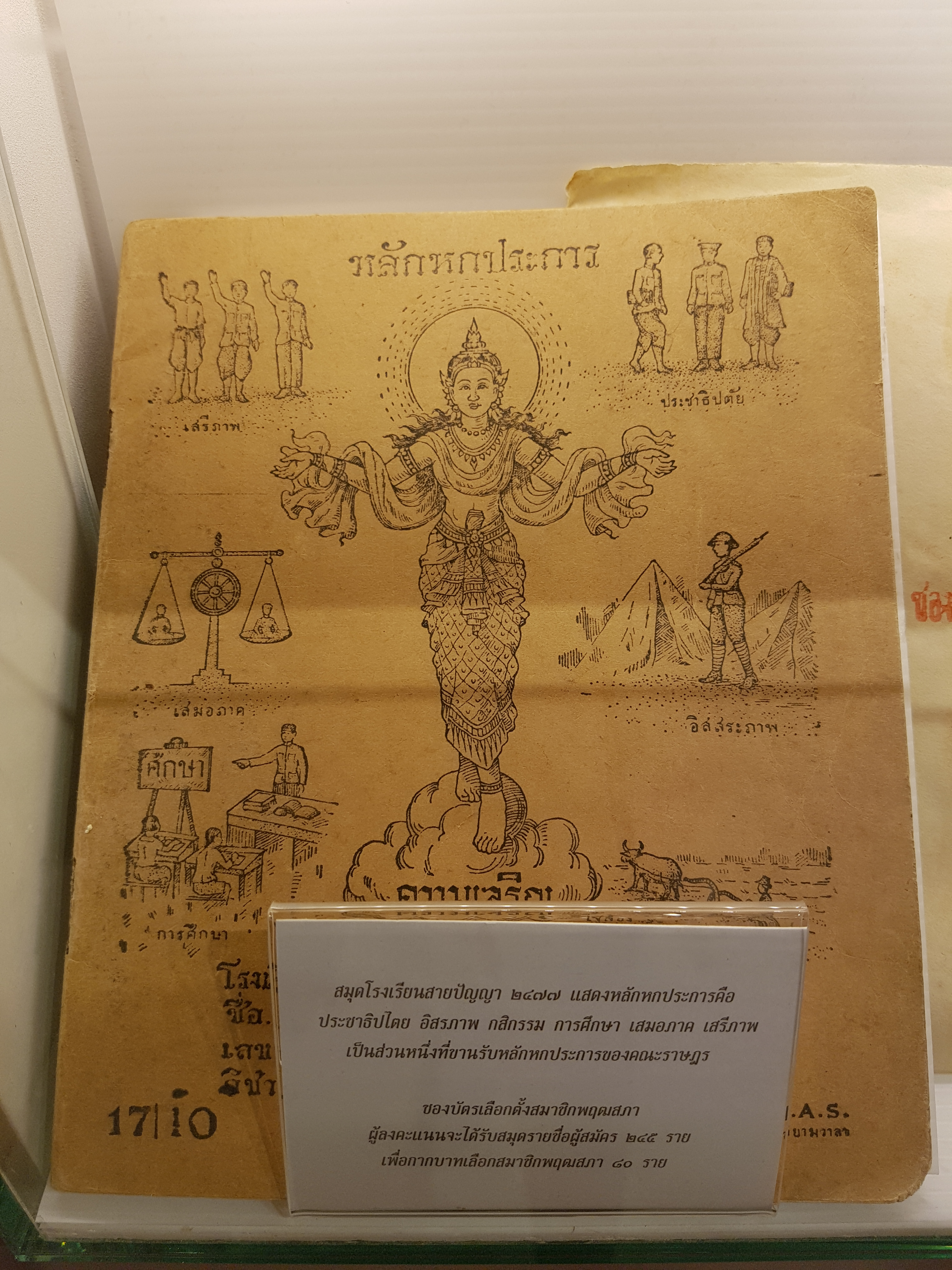
School books with six principles of People's Party on cover

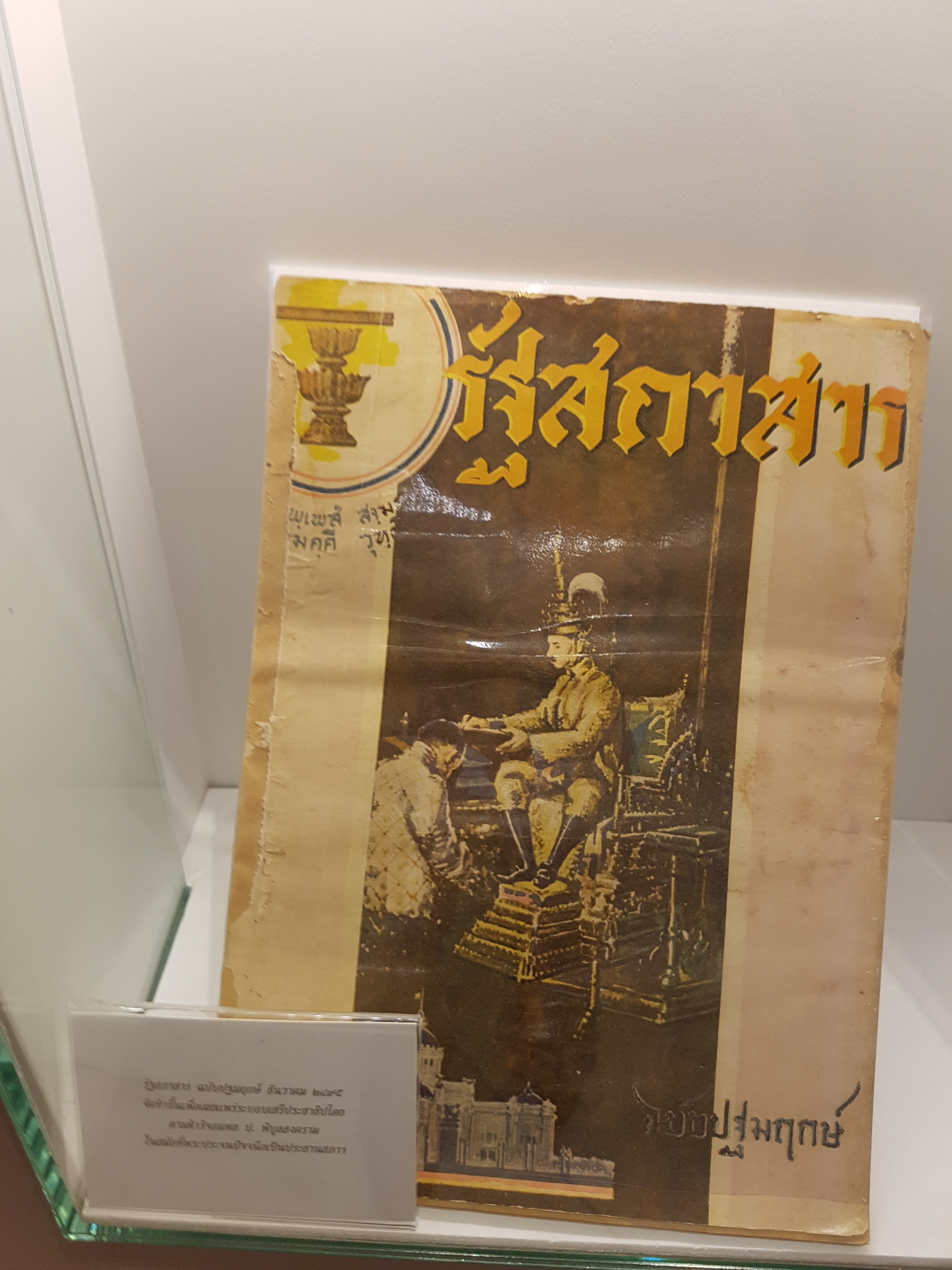
Historical political magazine

Exhibition at the museum

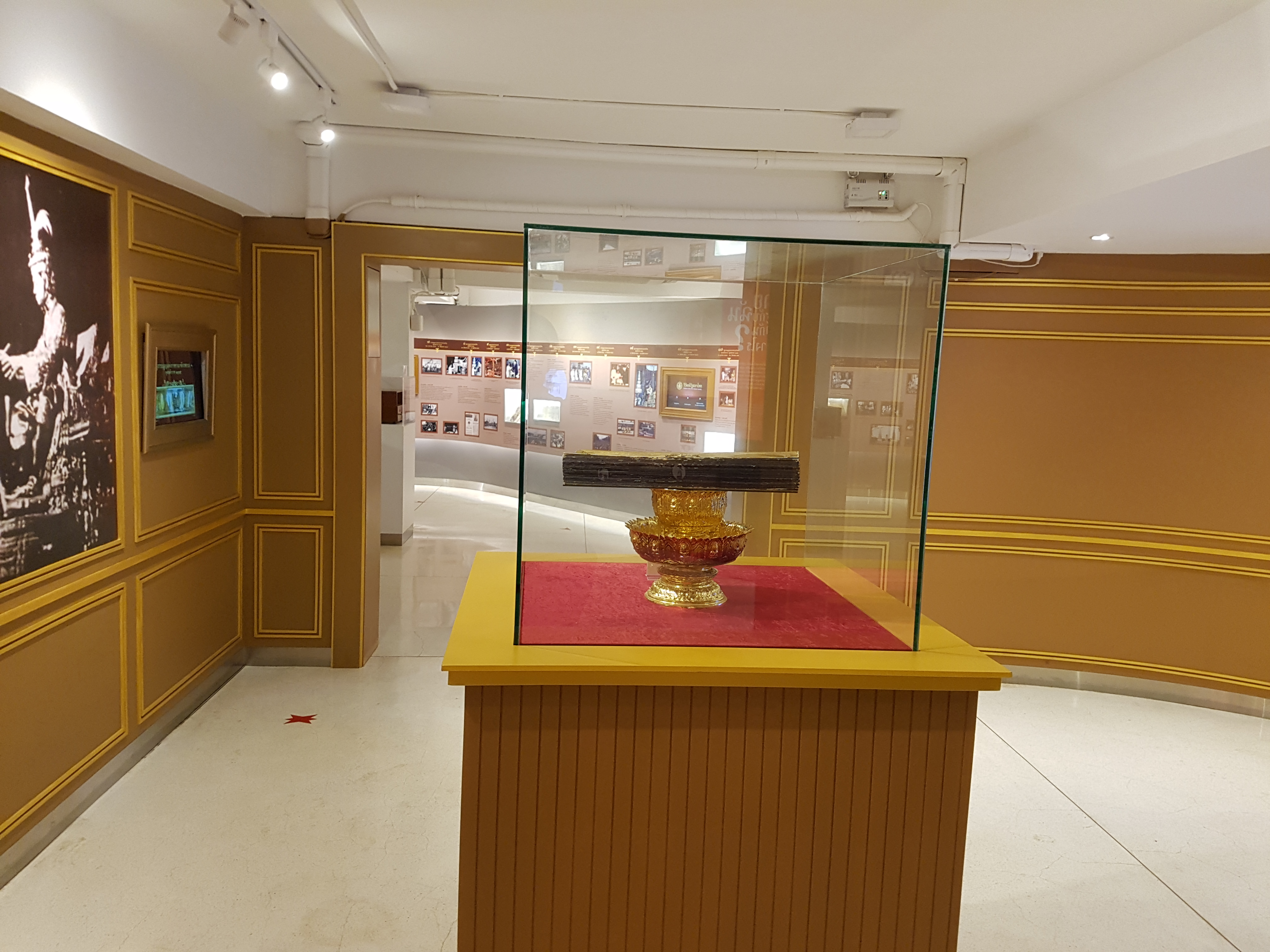

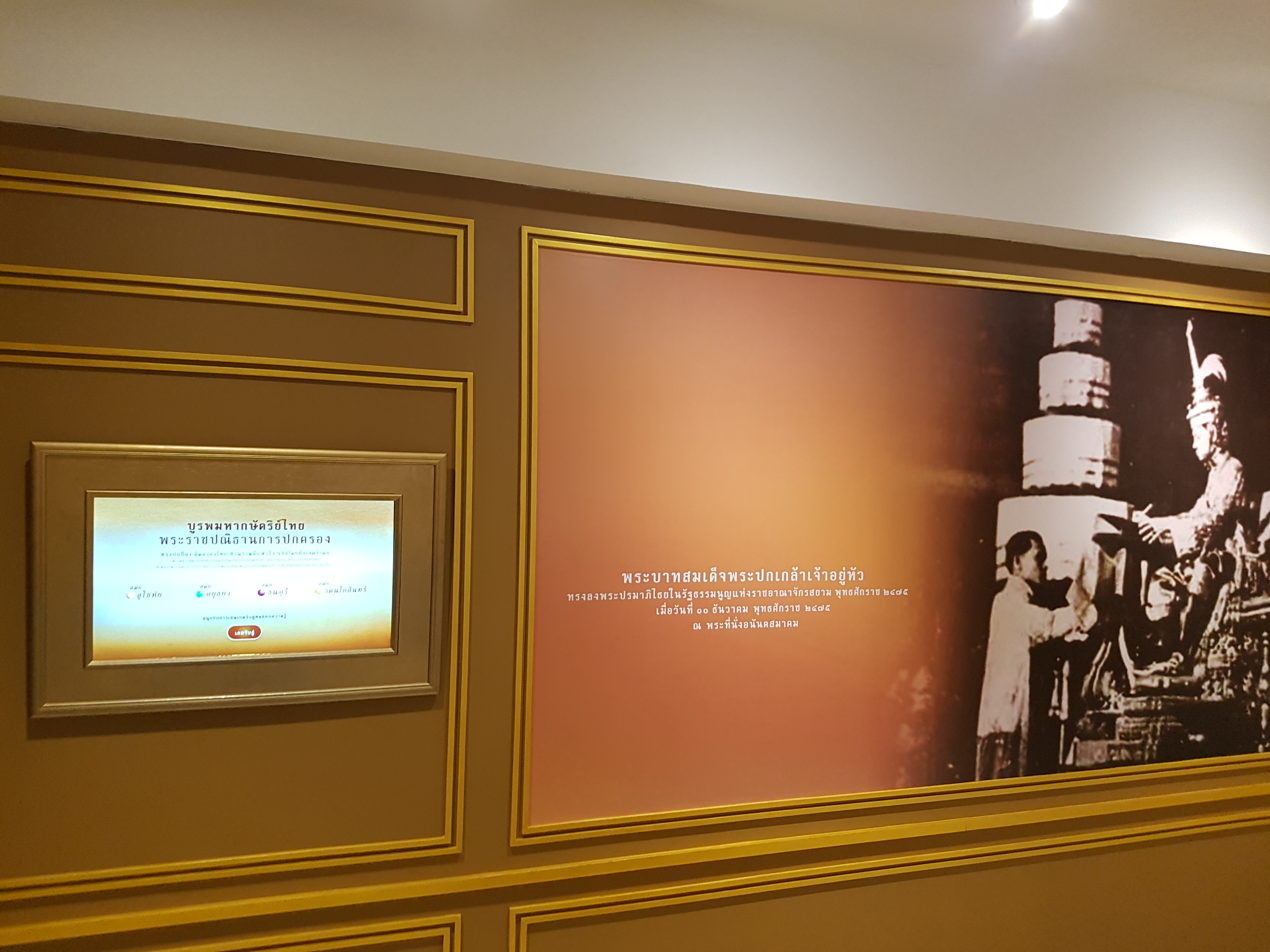

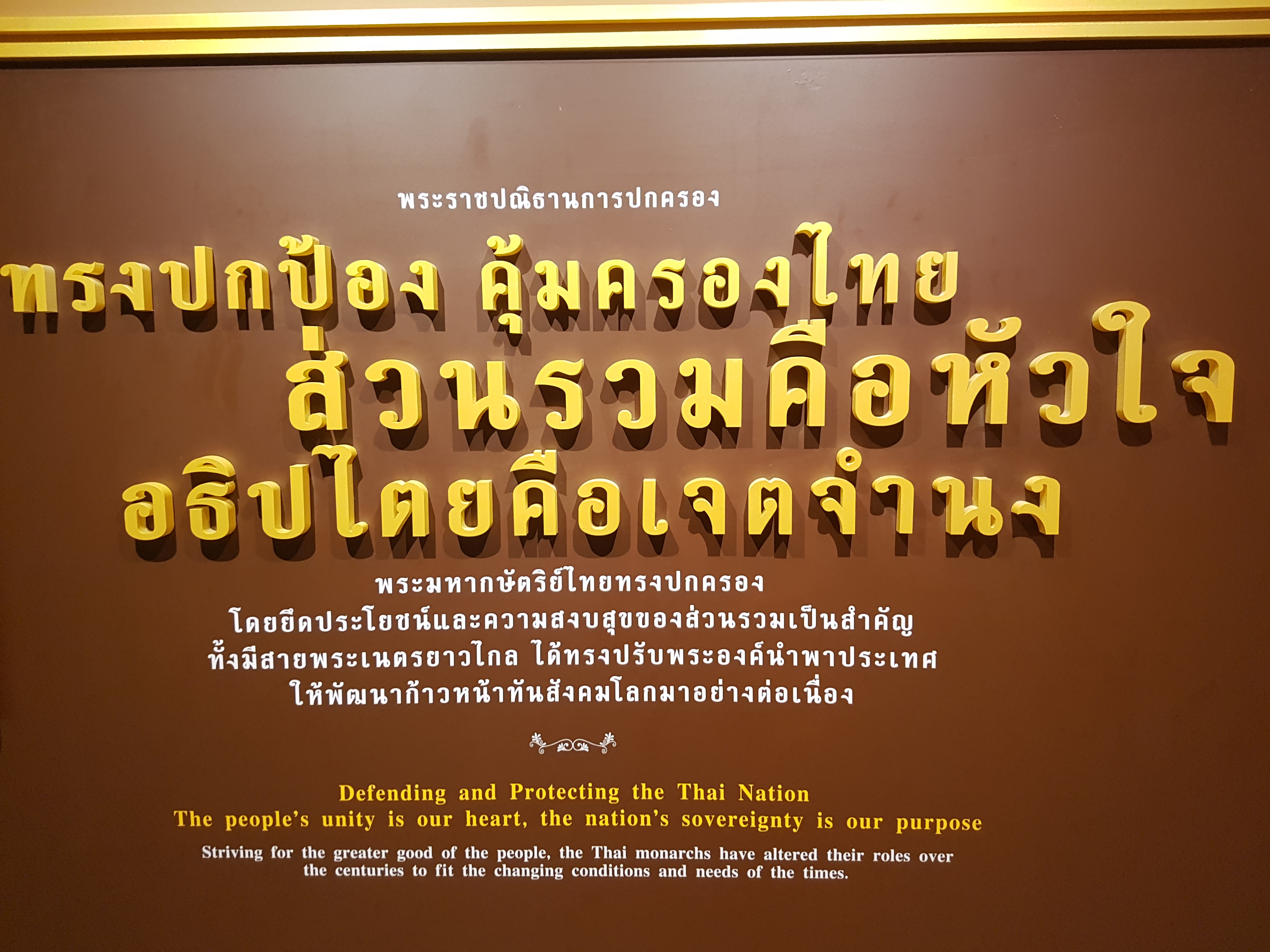

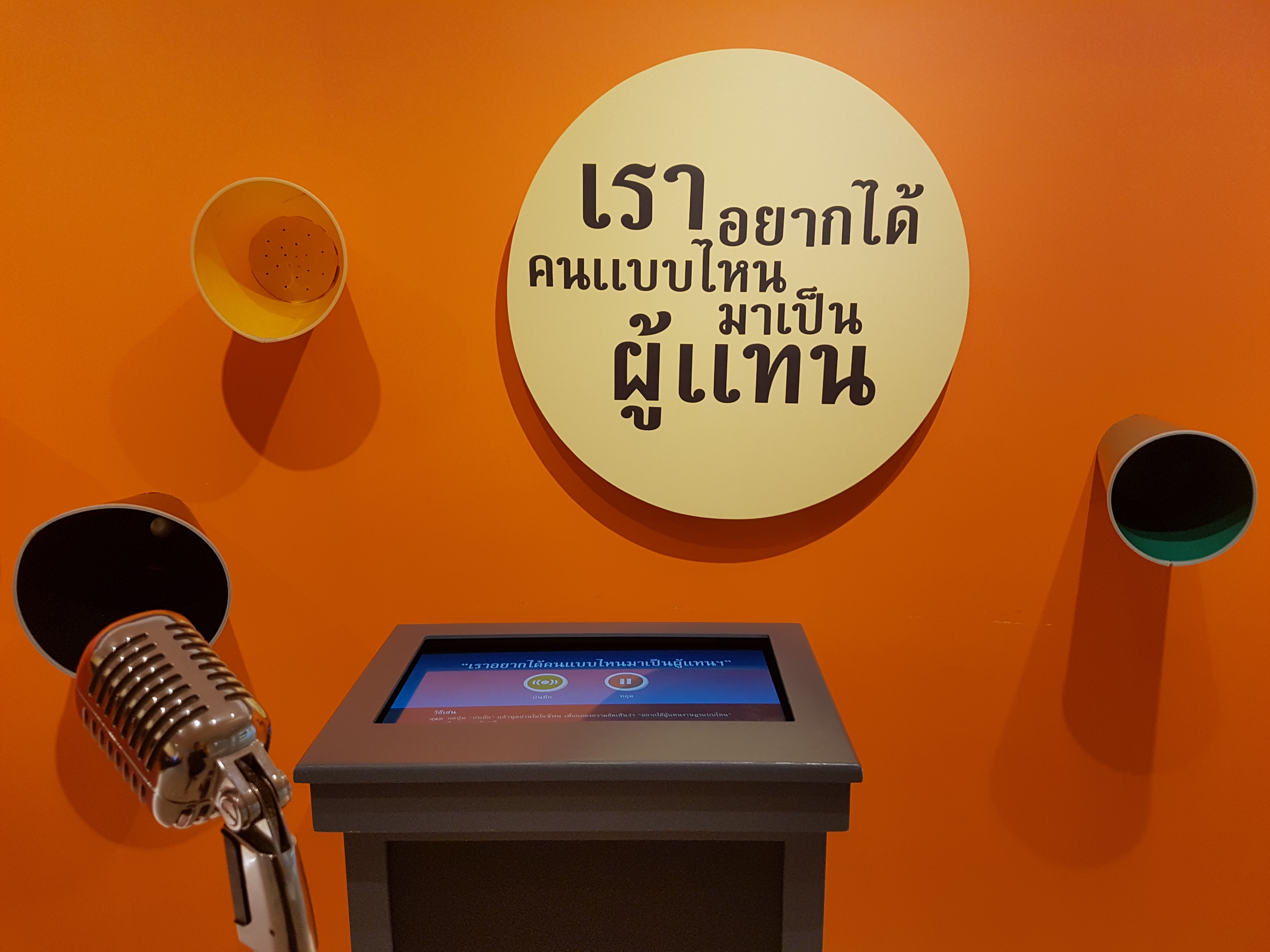

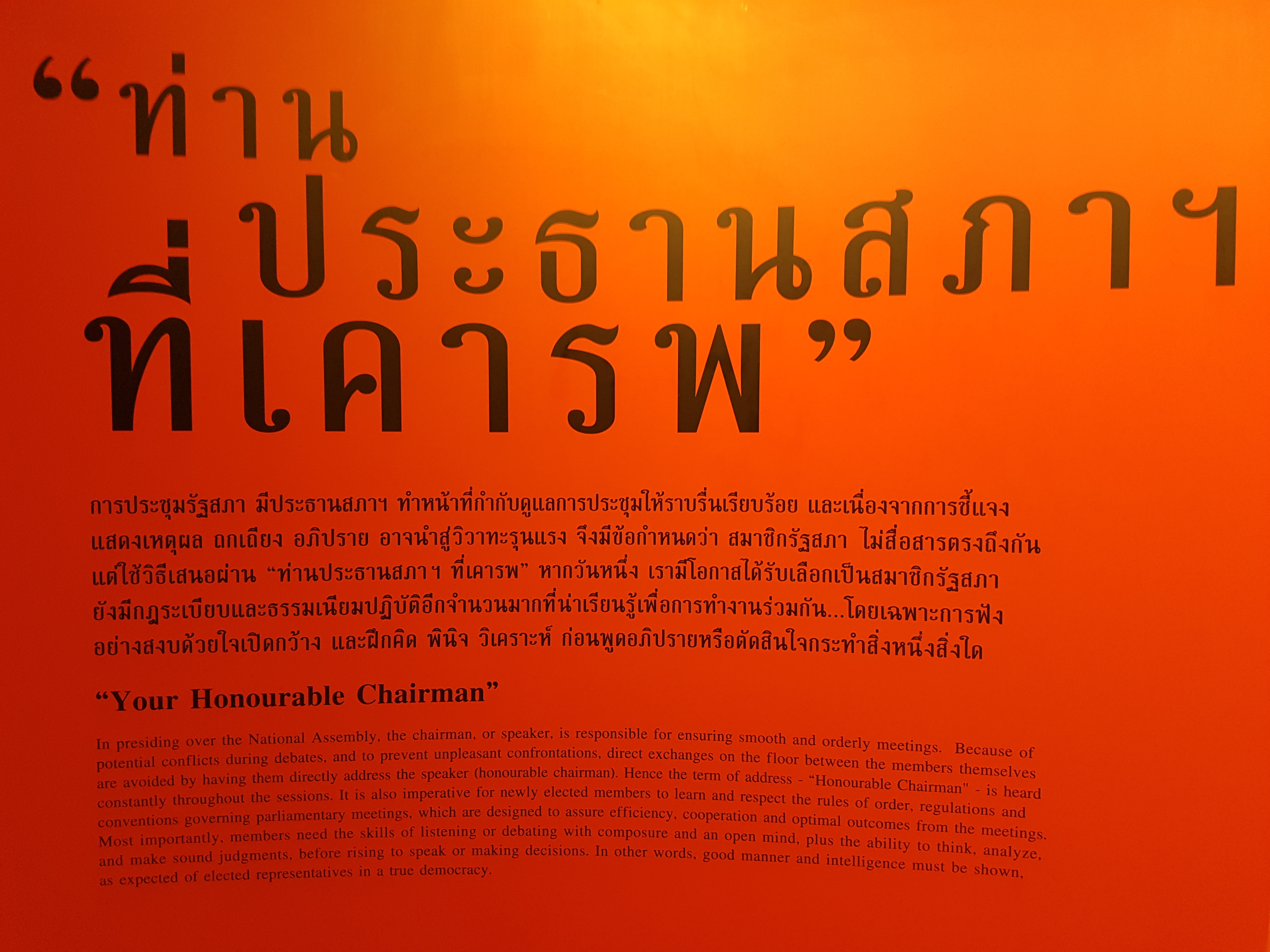

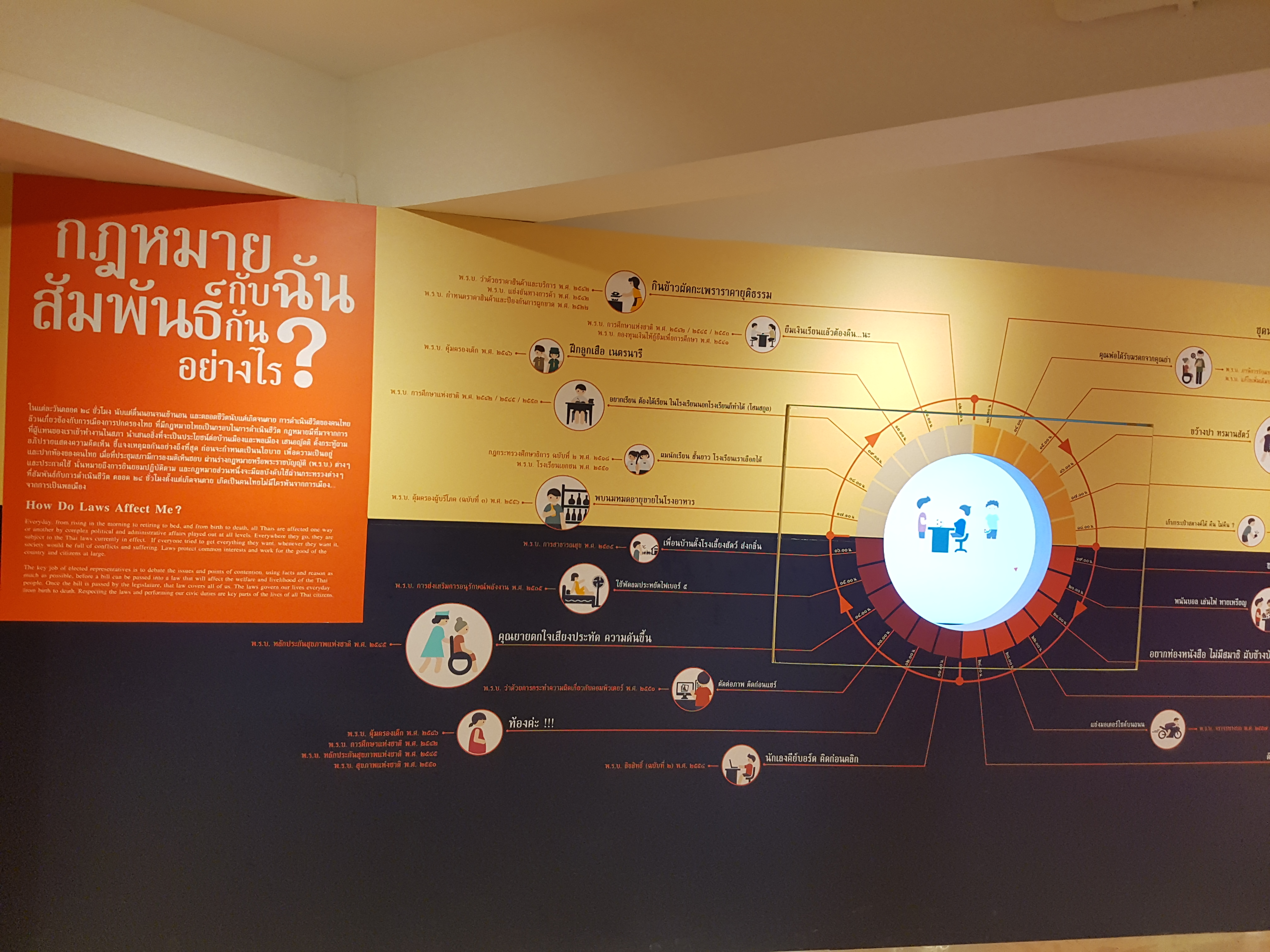

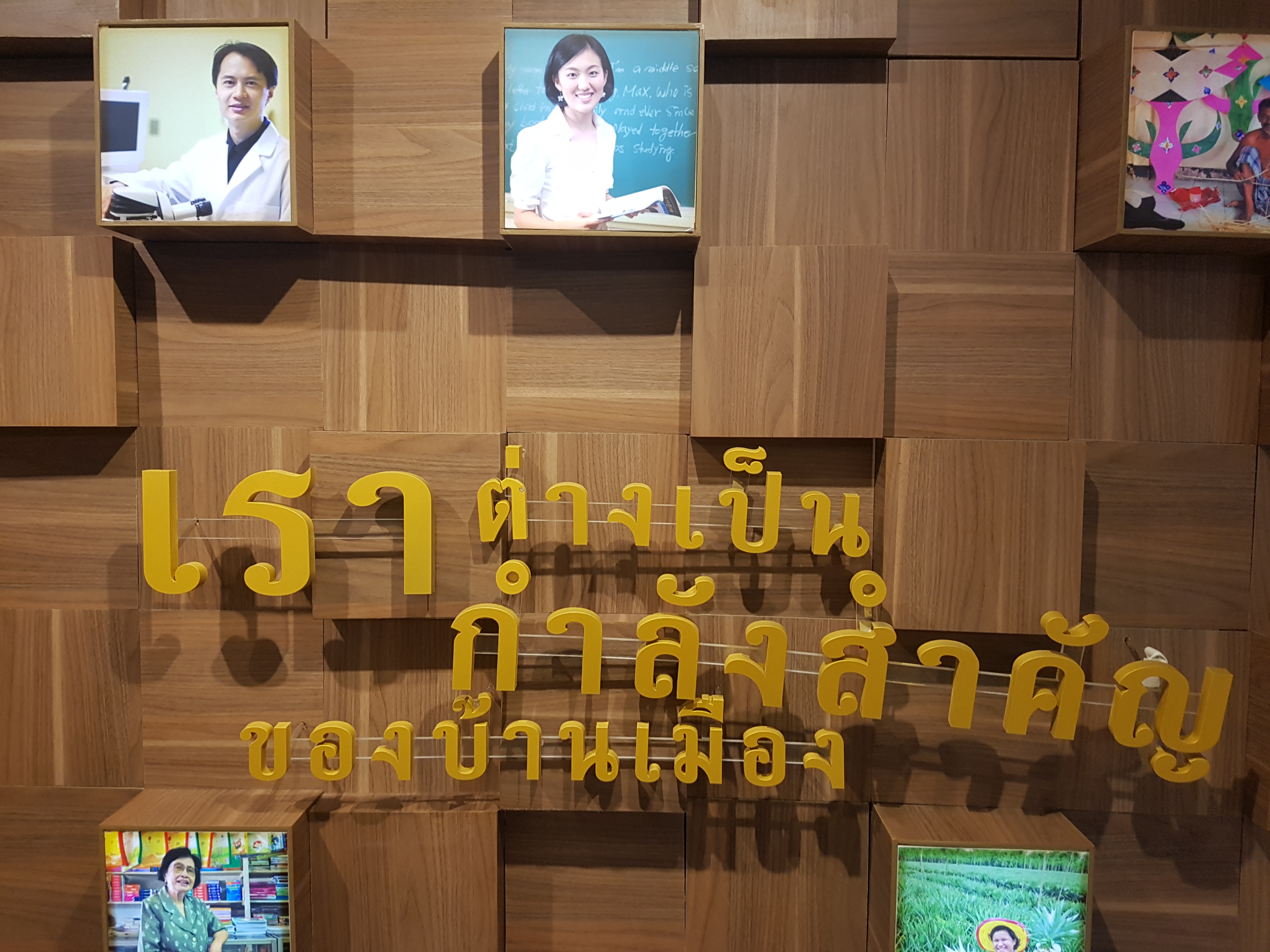

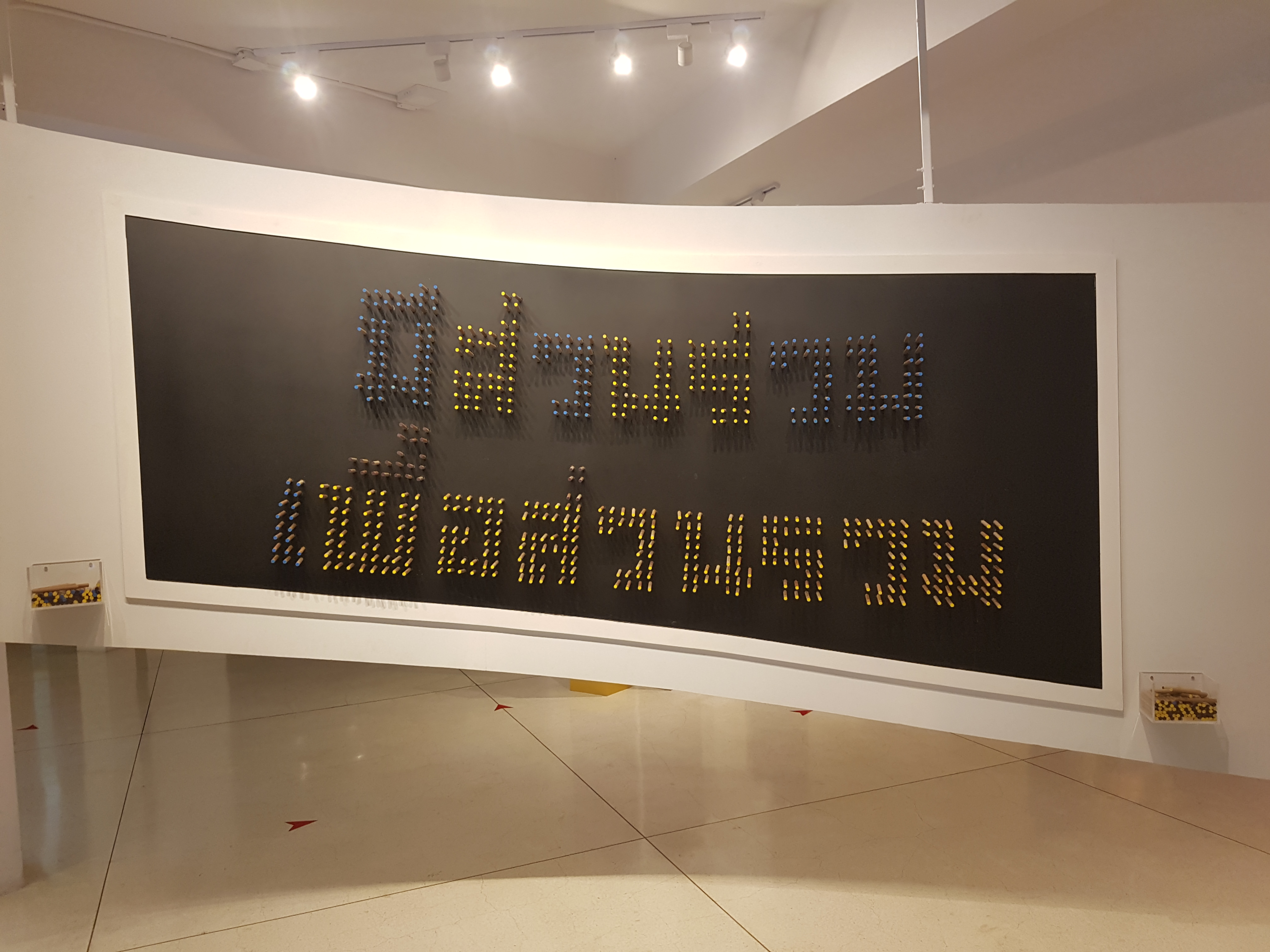

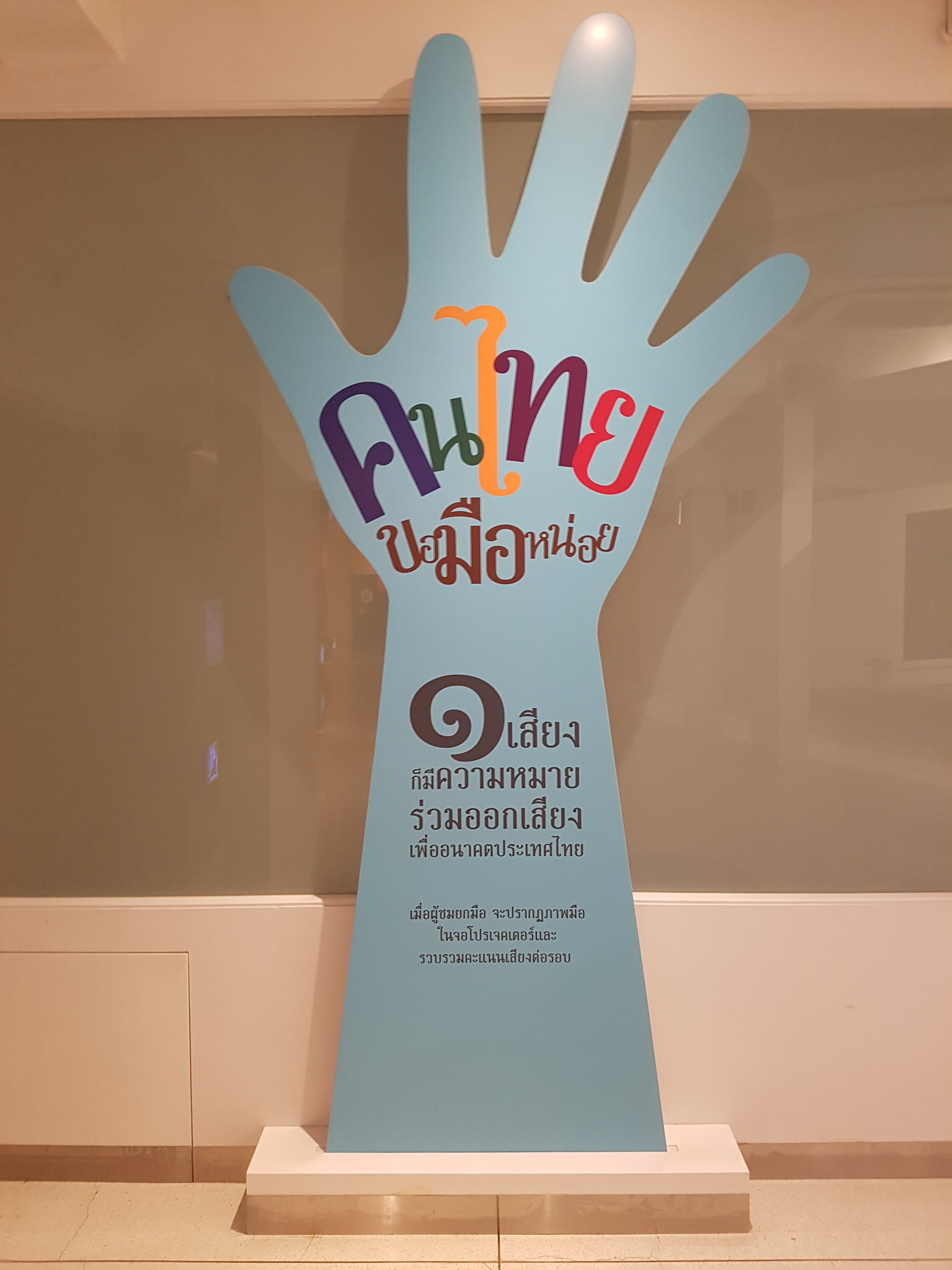

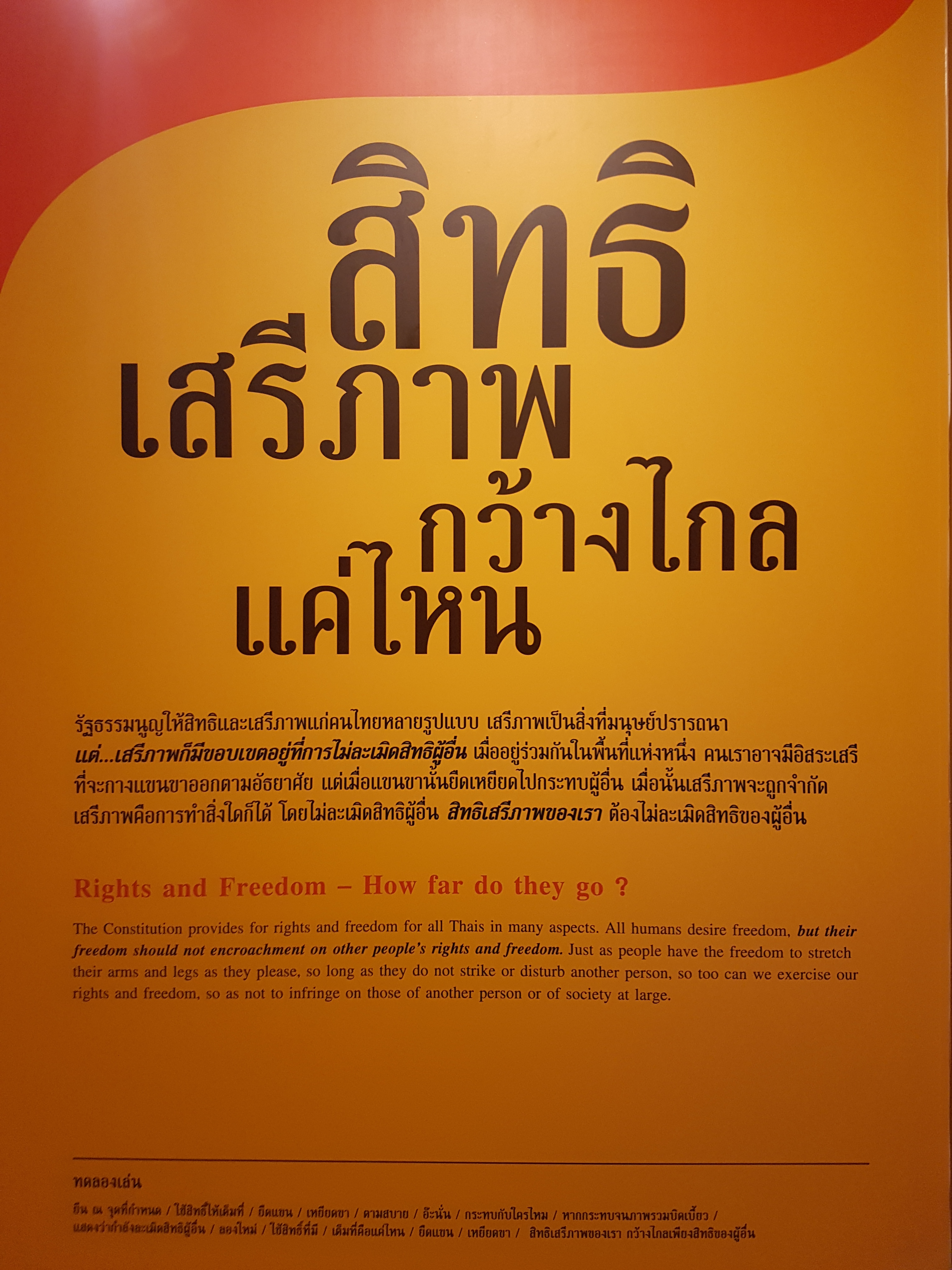

== See also ==
- Sappaya-Sapasathan
