= Old Parliament House, Bangkok =

Parliament House of Thailand
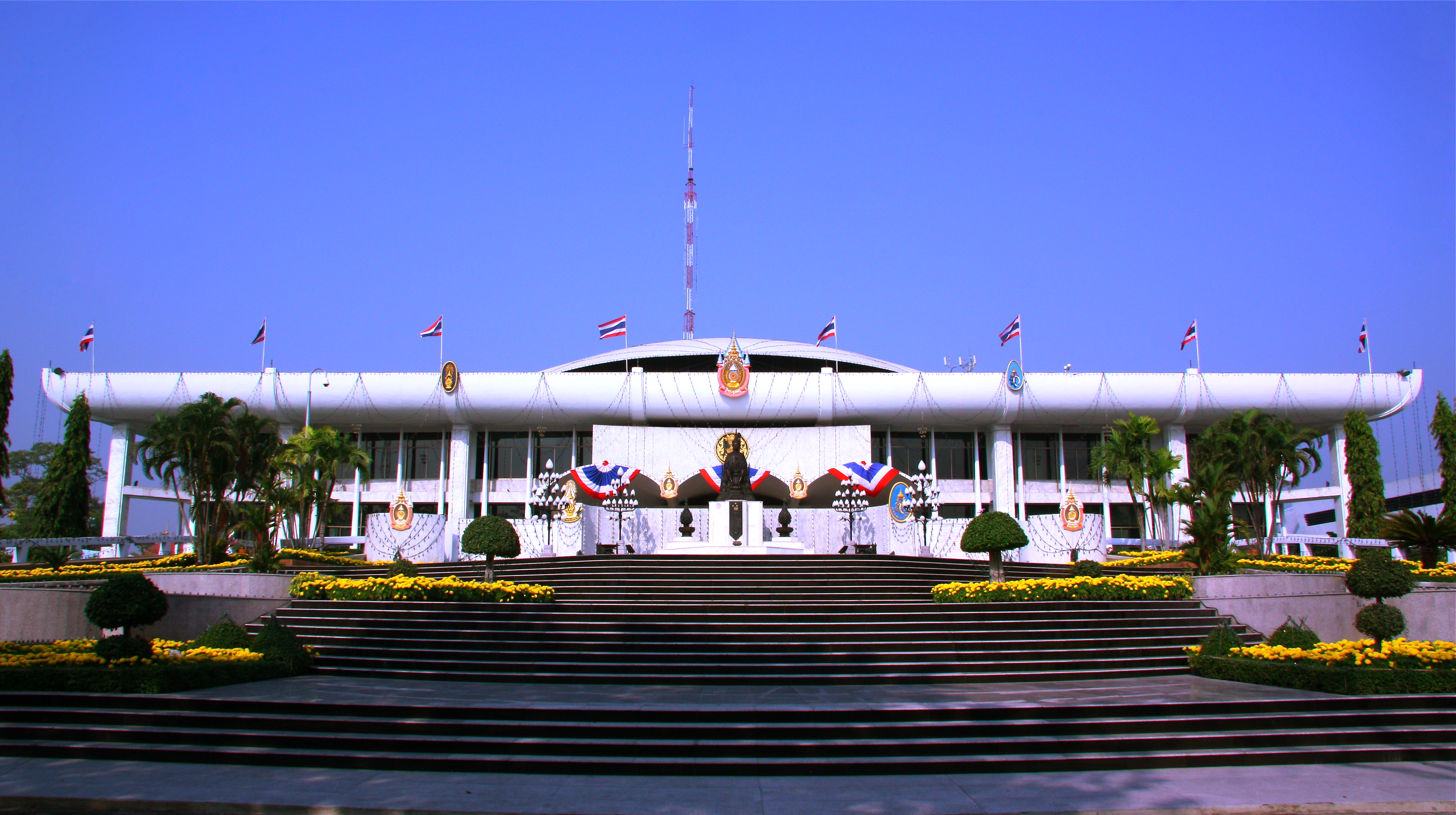

- Location within Thailand

General information
- Architectural style: Modern
- Location: Dusit, Bangkok, Thailand
- Coordinates: 13.7744°N 100.5140°E
- Construction started: 5 November 1970
- Completed: 19 September 1974
- Closed: 28 February 2019
- Client: National Assembly of Thailand (1974–2018)

Website
- parliament.go.th

The Parliament House of Thailand (Thai: อาคารรัฐสภาไทย) was a building which was the main place for meetings of the National Assembly, the legislative branch of the Government of Thailand from 1974 to 2018. The legislature is a bicameral body, consisting of two chambers: the higher chamber (The Senate of Thailand), and the lower one (House of Representatives of Thailand). The Parliament House of Thailand is in the Dusit District of the capital, Bangkok. In 2019, the legislature moved into a new building named The Sappaya-Sapasathan, which became the new parliament house.

== History ==
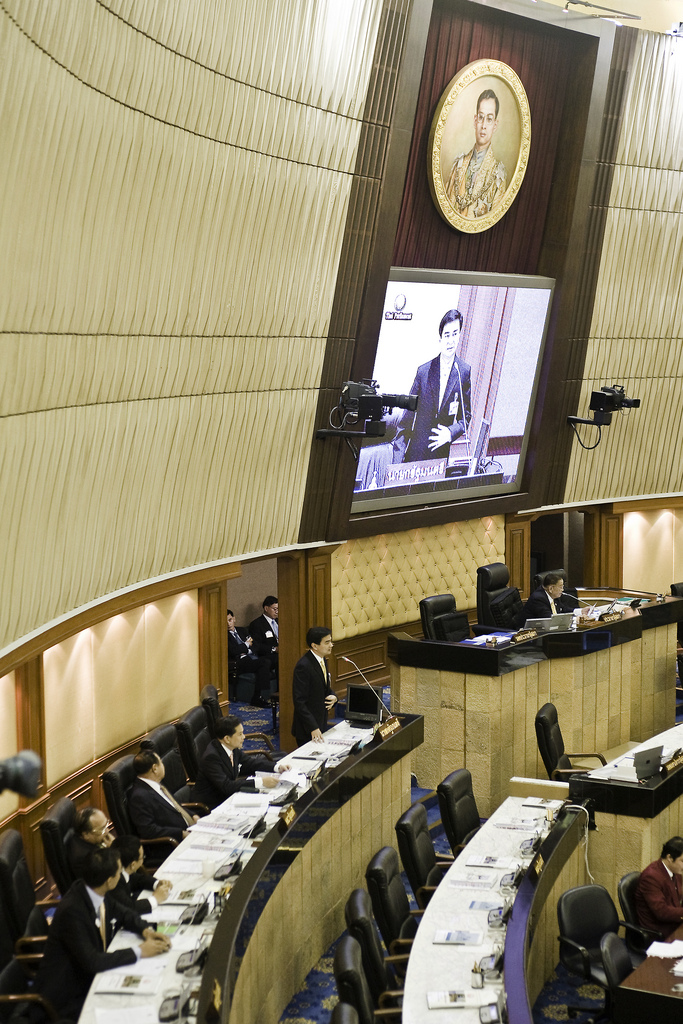
Prime Minister Abhisit Vejjajiva answering questions in the chamber, 2009

After the first general election to the National Assembly in 1933, King Prajadhipok gave the Ananta Samakhom Throne Hall to the new legislature. The Throne Hall was previously part of Dusit Palace. Throughout the years, the composition of the National Assembly increased and the Throne Hall became too small to accommodate all the members and the parliament's support offices. Three attempts were made to build a new building, however, each failed because the government in power was unseated before a budget could be appropriated. King Bhumibol Adulyadej appropriated to the National Assembly royal land immediately north of the Throne Hall for the site of the new Parliament House. Construction began on 5 November 1970, with a budget of 51,027,360 baht.

== Structure ==
The new Parliament House complex consists of three main buildings:

- The Parliament House – A three-story structure that serves as the meeting chambers for the National Assembly, accommodating both the Senate and the House. It also houses the offices of the President and Vice President of the National Assembly, along with those of the deputy presiding officers.
- The Secretariat Building – A seven-story facility that contains the offices of the National Assembly Secretariat, workspace for members, and an in-house printing press.
- The Parliament Club – A two-story building that provides recreational and meeting facilities for assembly members.

Parliament House was first used on September 19, 1974, as the Ananta Samakhom Throne Hall became once more a part of the Dusit Palace and returned permanently to the Thai monarchy. From then on, Parliament House became the primary building used for the National Assembly, and only the State Opening is held in the Throne Hall.

== Statue of King Prajadhipok ==
At the front of the legislative building is a statue of a seated King Prajadhipok. The statue is half life-size. It depicts the king in royal regalia, sitting on the Phuttan Kanchanasinghat Throne. The Thai Parliament Museum is underneath the statue.

== New parliament building ==
A new 424,000 square meter parliament building, named Sappaya-Sapasathan, was due to be inaugurated by the end of 2020. It was contracted in 2013 and was scheduled to be opened in 2015. It is located on a bank of the Chao Phraya River in Kiakkai, occupying 300,000 m^{2} of land. The site of the current parliament building was returned to its previous owner, the Bureau of the Royal Household, at the end of 2018. However, construction of the new building was delayed. Concurrently, the project budget grew from 14 billion baht to 23 billion baht. The Parliament levied no penalties on the developer for missing the deadline. As the land where the old parliament building sat had been returned to the Crown Property Bureau, Parliament meetings were held in an auditorium rented from telecom firm TOT at a cost of 11 million baht per month.

Around February 2019, the Bureau of the Royal Household began demolishing the remaining buildings and was merged into the area of Dusit Palace.

== Gallery ==
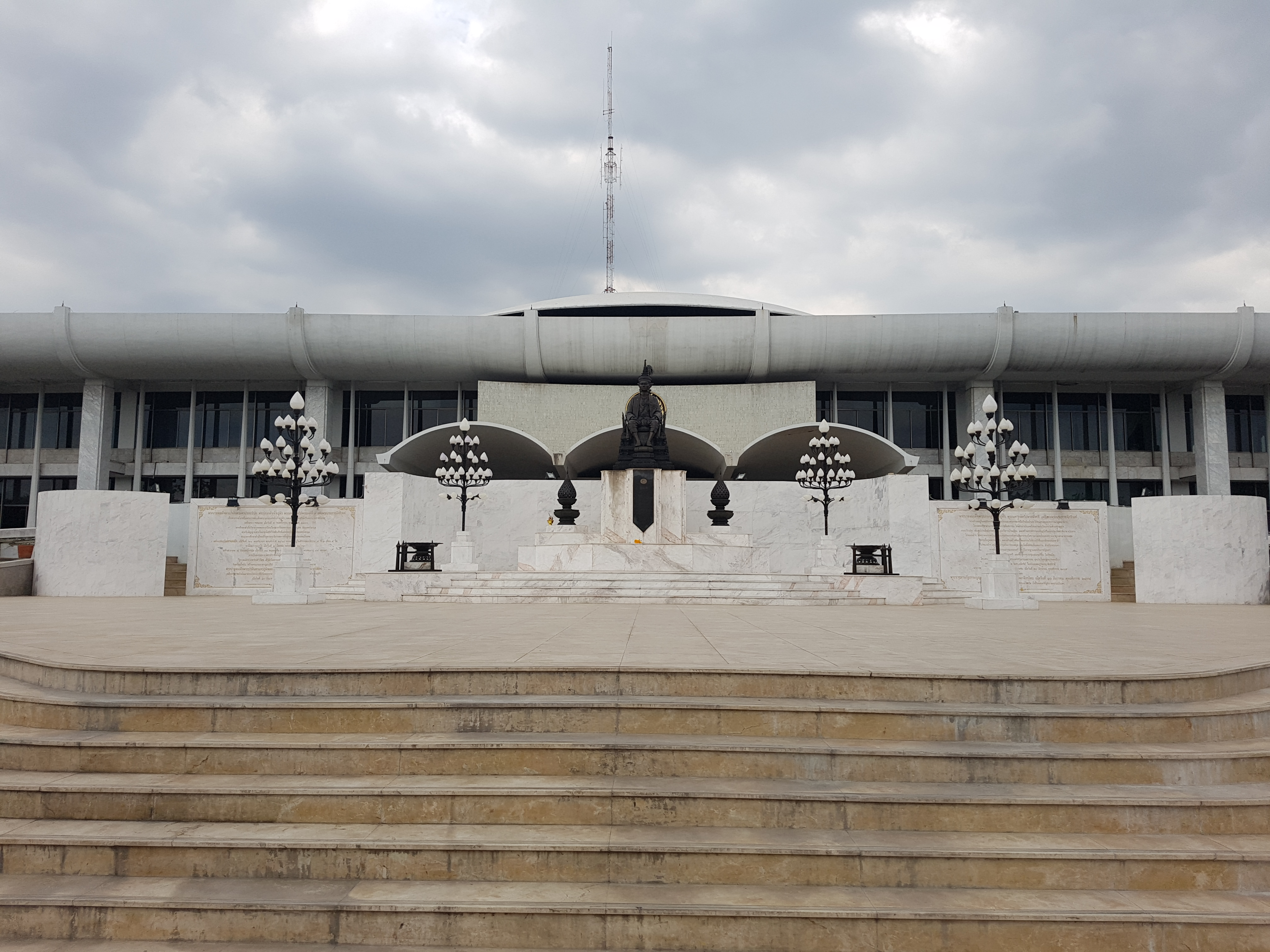
Statue of King Prajadhipok in the front

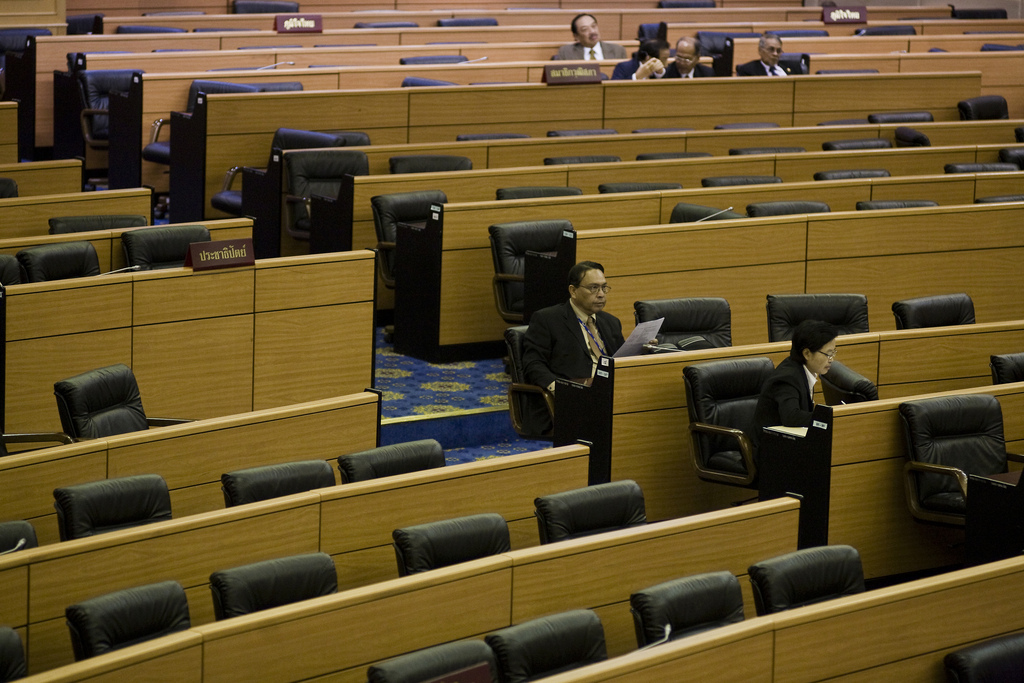
Empty desks at Parliament House

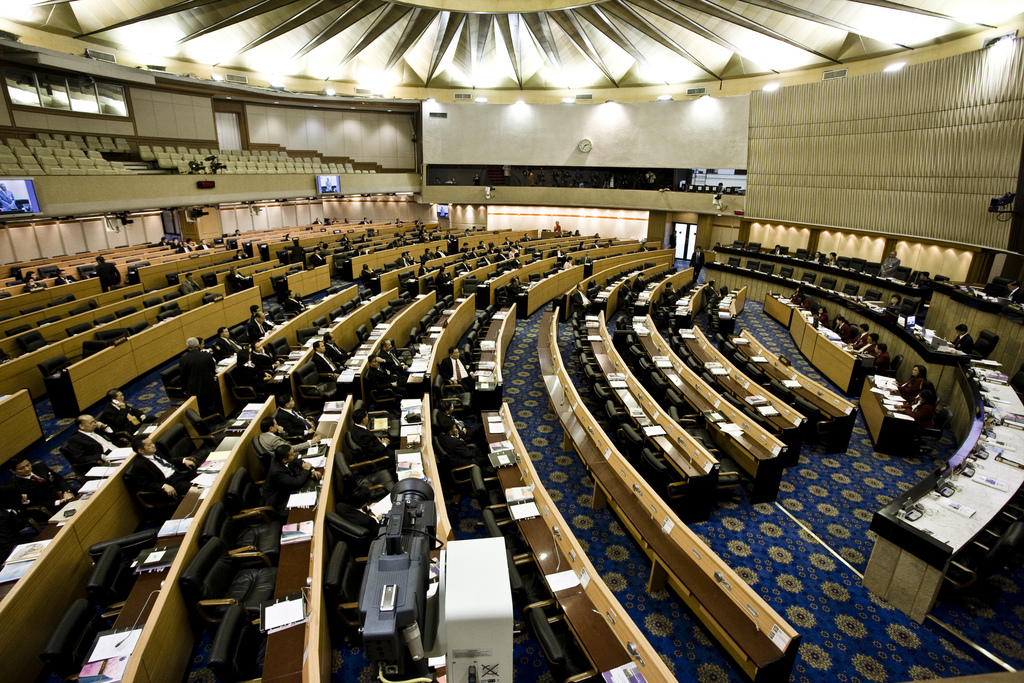
Debating chamber

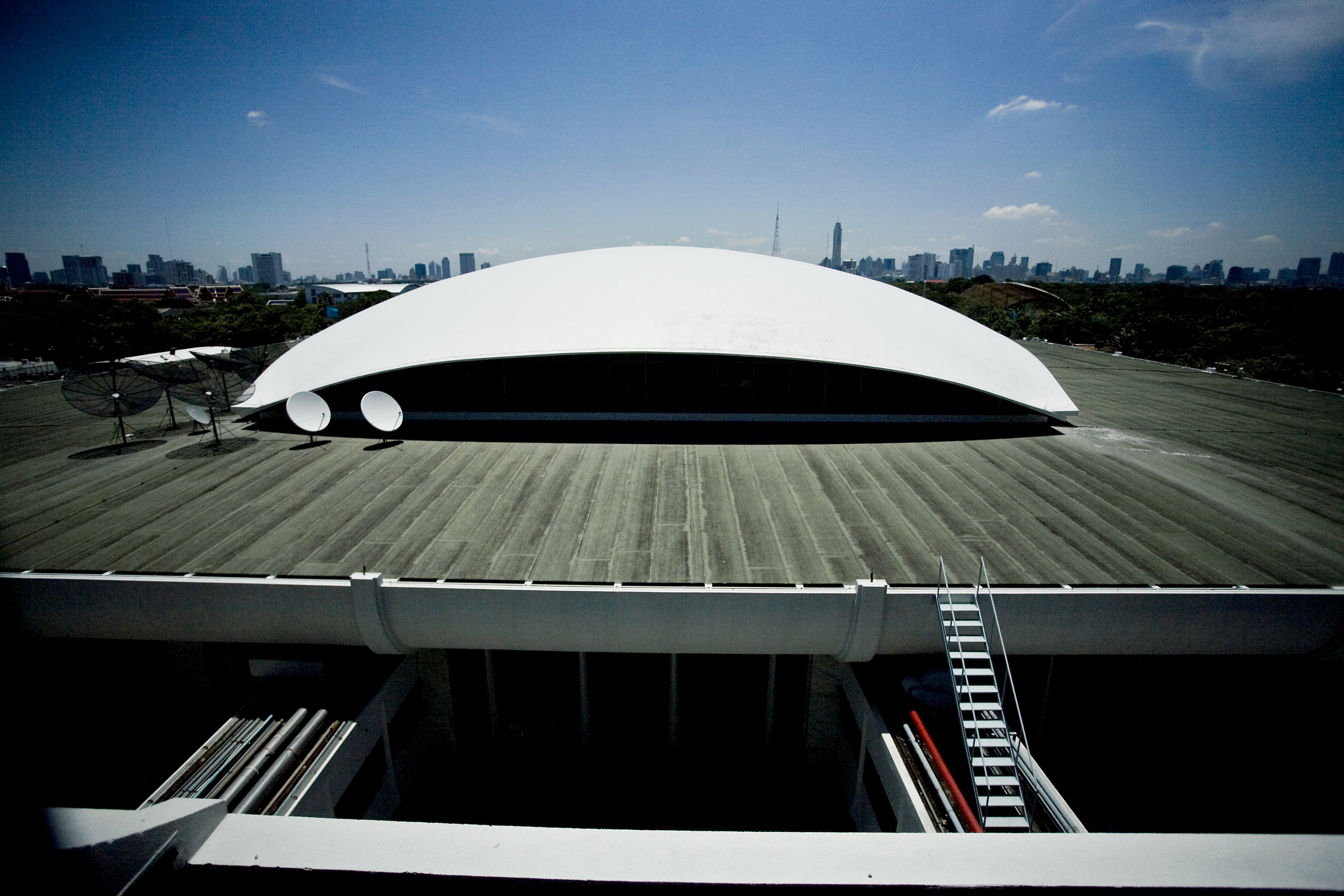
Dome of assembly room

== See also ==
- National Assembly of Thailand – Legislature of Thailand
  - Senate of Thailand
  - House of Representatives of Thailand
- Ananta Samakhom Throne Hall – Previous home of the National Assembly
- Government House of Thailand – Home of the executive branch of the Royal Thai Government
- Thai Parliament Museum
