= King Prajadhipok Museum =

Museum in Bangkok, Thailand

Coordinates: 13°45′22″N 100°30′23″E

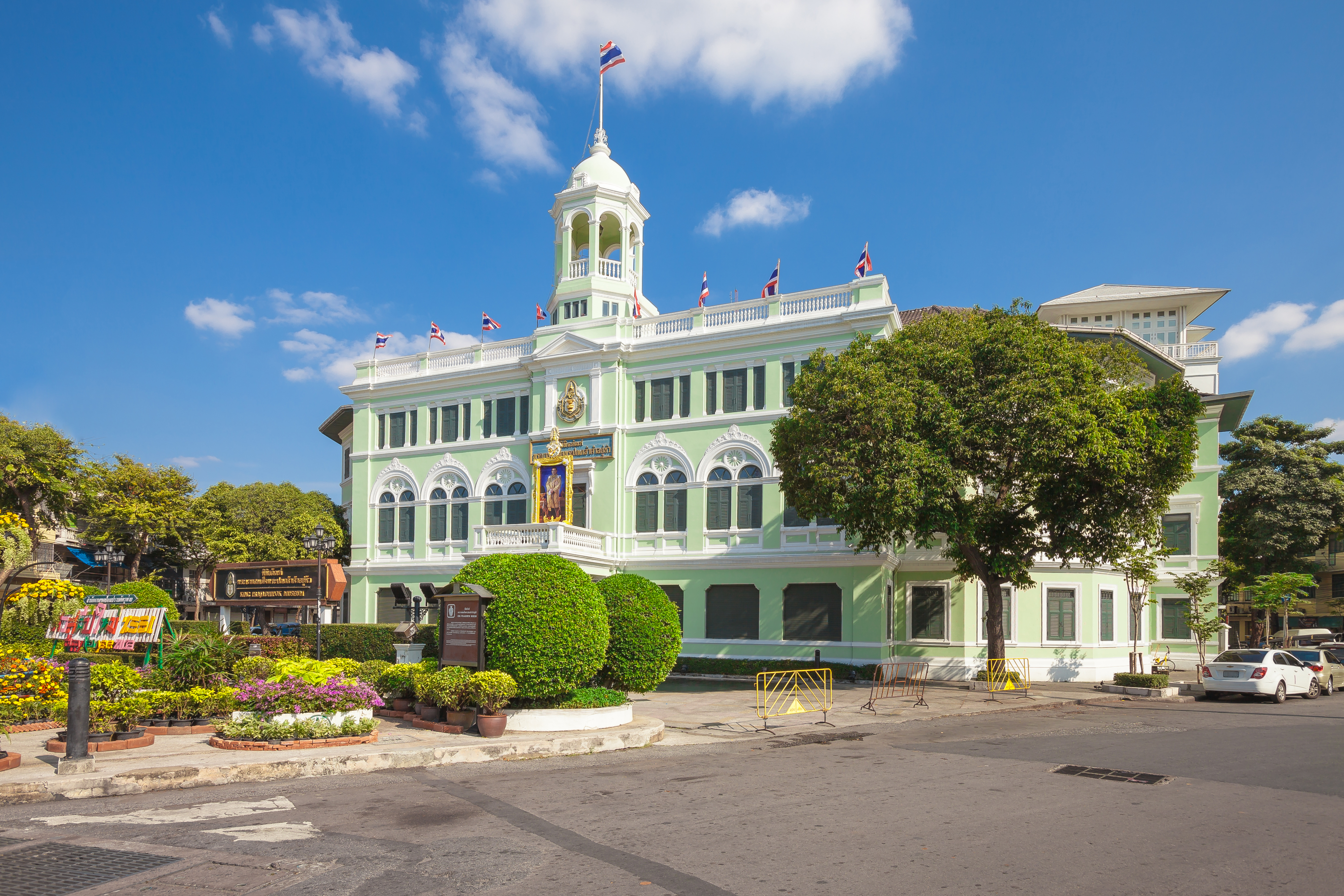
John Sampson & Son's Department Store, now change to King Prajadhipok Museum

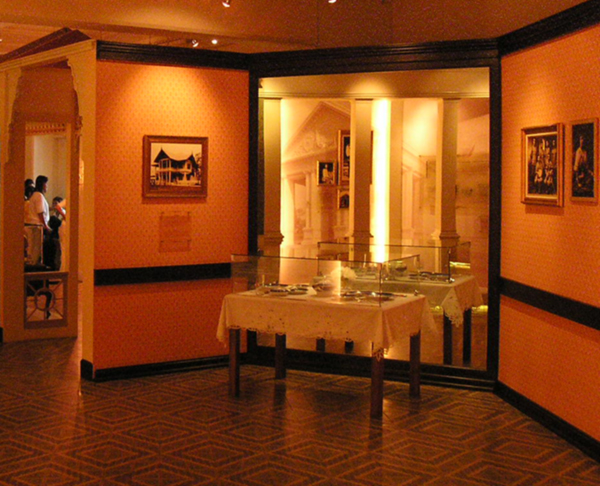
inside the museum

King Prajadhipok Museum is a museum in Pom Prap Sattru Phai District, Bangkok, Thailand. The building has three floors of permanent exhibitions relating to royal life of King Prajadhipok and Queen Rambai Barni of Thailand.

Formerly, this building is the location of the John Sampson & Son's department store, known briefly as "John Sampson", which is a branch of a shop selling tailor-made shoes and famous saddles in the area. Bond Street, London has expanded its branches to Thailand. Following the persuasion of King Chulalongkorn in the year 1898, he later ordered the construction of this building and open for rent until the company dissolved.

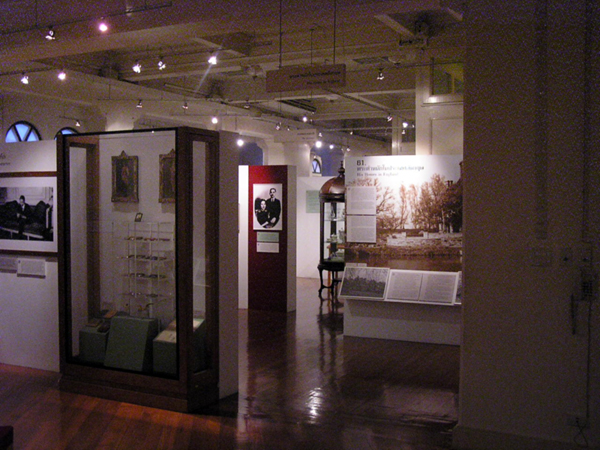
King Prajadhipok Museum on floor 2

Subsequently, Luang Maitriwanich (Chalerm Yotmani) entered the rental of the building. Therefore, changed the name to "Suthadilok Department Store" until the contract expired in the year 1933, the Department of Public Works therefore rented the office of the department.On 26 April 2001, King Prajadhipok's Institute was transferred Museum operations from the Department of Public Works until the renovation of the building was completed in late November 2002.

The museum has a collection of King Rama VII and the Queen's royal displays showing photos, documents and a royal biography.
