= Yothinburana School =

- โรงเรียนโยธินบูรณะ

Location
- Bangkok; Thailand
- 13°48′49″N 100°31′12″E

Information
- Type: Public Secondary
- Motto: โยธินถิ่นคนดี (Yothin, Land of Good People)
- School district: Dusit
- Campus Director: Mr. Thanakul Chonkaew
- Teaching staff: 228
- Grades: 7-12
- Gender: Co-educational
- Nickname: Yothin
- Sub-division: Bang Sue
- Website: www.yothinburana.ac.th

Yothinburana School (Thai: โรงเรียนโยธินบูรณะ) is a publicly funded secondary school with nearly 4,000 students in Bangkok, Thailand under the jurisdiction of the General Education Department of Ministry of Education. It is in the Bang Sue District of Bangkok, having moved from the Dusit District in 2012.

== Partnership ==
Yothinburana School has a partnership with:

- Ivybridge Community College, Devon, England.
