= Saowani Bridge =

Saowani Bridge สะพานเสาวนี
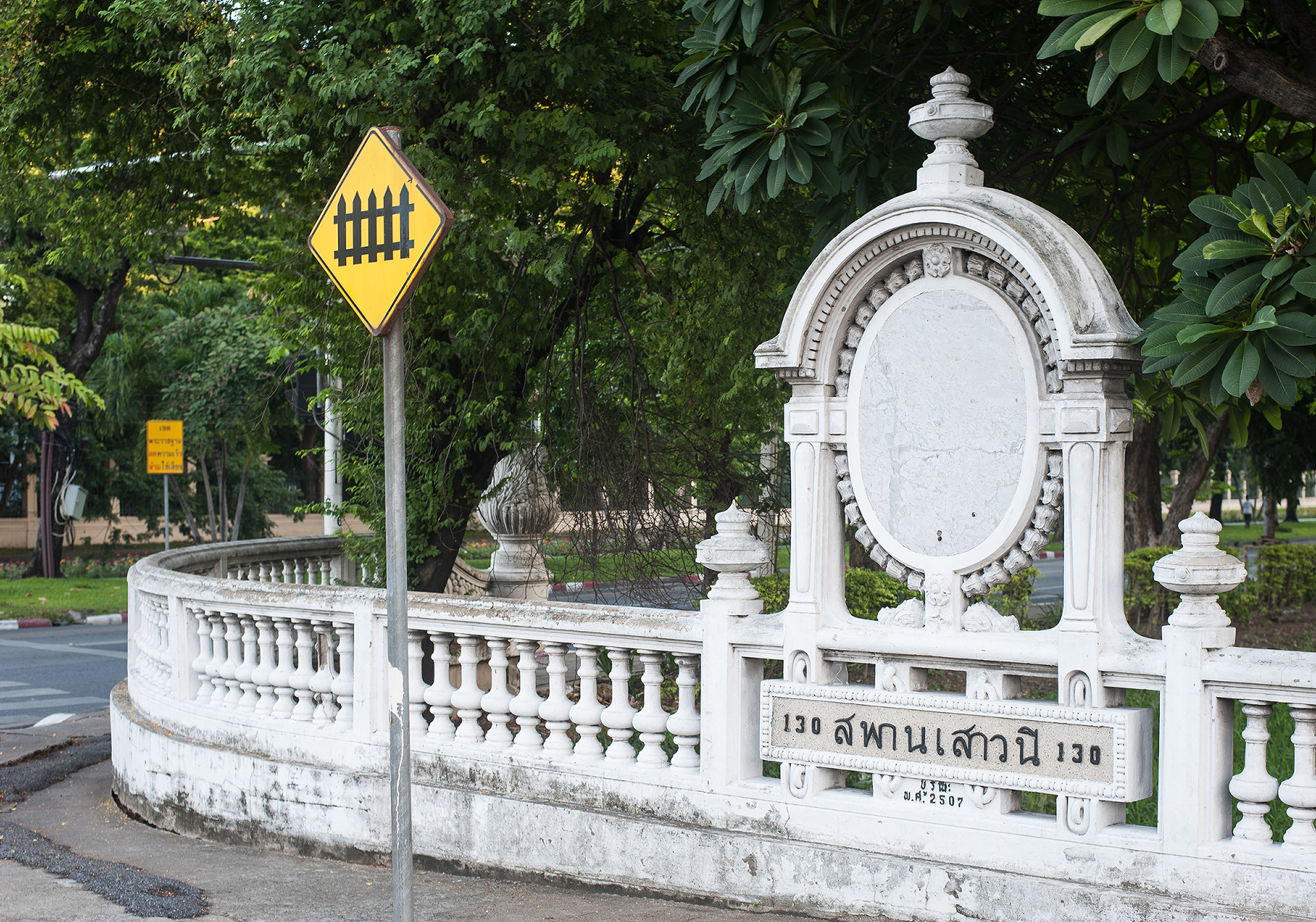
- Saowani Bridge in 2014
- Coordinates: 13°45′47″N 100°31′23″E
- Carries: Si Ayutthaya Road
- Crosses: A canal next to the railway tracks
- Locale: Suan Chitlada Subdistrict, Dusit District, Bangkok, Thailand
- Official name: Saowani Bridge
- Maintained by: Bangkok Metropolitan Administration (BMA)

History
- Opened: 1911

Saowani Bridge (Note: Also spelled as Saowanee Bridge.) (Thai: สะพานเสาวนี, RTGS: Saphan Saowani, pronounced [sà.pʰaːn sǎːw.níː]) is a historic bridge in Bangkok, Thailand. It carries Si Ayutthaya Road over a canal running alongside three railway tracks, situated between Chitralada railway station and Sam Sen railway station.

The bridge is located at the southeast corner of Chitralada Royal Villa in the Suan Chitlada Subdistrict, Dusit District. After crossing the railway tracks, it enters the Thung Phaya Thai Subdistrict in Ratchathewi District. The Dusit-side end of the bridge also serves as an intersection of the same name, where Si Ayutthaya Road cuts across Sawankhalok Road.

Designated as a registered ancient monument by the Fine Arts Department, Saowani Bridge was originally constructed of wood. Over time, it deteriorated and was rebuilt as a reinforced concrete bridge to commemorate the occasion of Queen Saovabha Phongsri's 48th birthday in 1911, the first year of King Vajiravudh's (Rama VI) reign.

A distinctive feature of this bridge is its four corners, each adorned with large vase-shaped stucco reliefs decorated with female figures and intricate vine patterns. The center of the bridge features an arched pavilion embellished with floral motifs, with the bridge's name displayed on a plaque at the base of the arch. The bridge's posts and railings are shaped like palm buds and line both sides and the approaches.

Originally, the bridge was narrower than it is today. Its width was later expanded to accommodate the growing traffic along Si Ayutthaya Road. During the renovation, the delicate stucco reliefs and ornamental designs were carefully removed, preserved, and then reassembled to match their original appearance.
