= Chamai Maru Chet Bridge =

Chamai Maru Chet Bridge สะพานชมัยมรุเชฐ
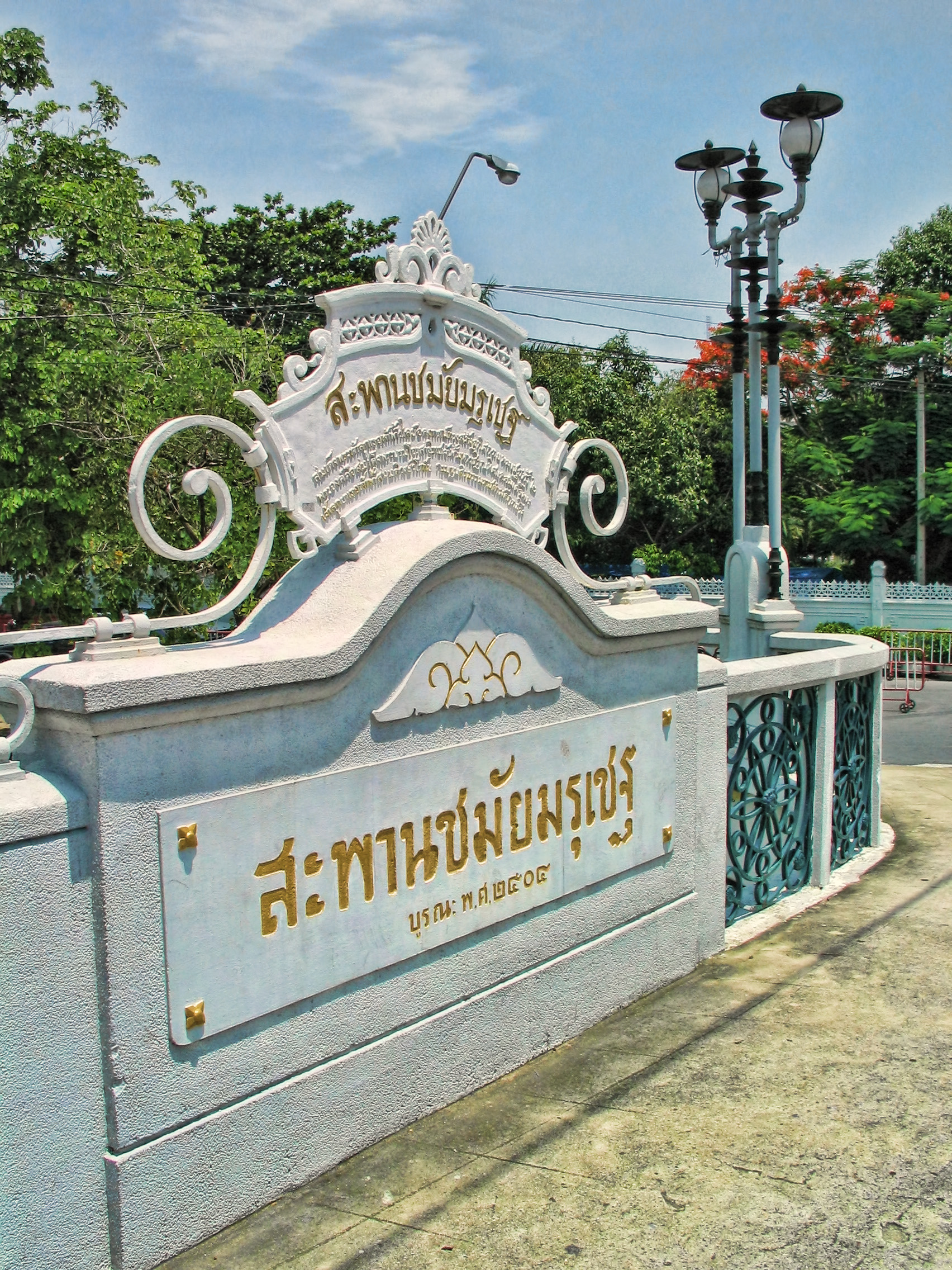
- Coordinates: 13.763311°N 100.513486°E
- Carries: Phitsanulok Rd (4 lanes of roadway and footpaths)
- Crosses: Khlong Prem Prachakon
- Locale: Dusit and Suan Chitlada, Dusit, Bangkok, Thailand
- Official name: Saphan Chamai Maru Chet
- Maintained by: Bangkok Metropolitan Administration (BMA)

History
- Construction start: 1901
- Opened: January 16, 1902

Chamai Maru Chet Bridge (Thai: สะพานชมัยมรุเชฐ, RTGS: Saphan Chamai Maru Chet, pronounced [sā.pʰāːn t͡ɕʰā.māj mā.rúʔ t͡ɕʰêːt]) is a historic bridge in Bangkok, situated on Phitsanulok Road in Dusit and Suan Chitlada Subdistricts, Dusit District, near the Government House, Rajavinit Mathayom School, King Rama IX Memorial Park, Rajamangala University of Technology Phra Nakhon (Nang Loeng Campus), and Wat Benchamabophit. At its eastern end, near Rajavinit Mathayom School, lies Phanitchayakan Intersection, the meeting point of Rama V and Phitsanulok Roads.

In 1901, Princess Valaya Alongkorn, then in her 17th year, commissioned the construction of the bridge as a charitable tribute to her two elder brothers, Prince Maha Vajirunhis and Prince Sommatiwongse Varodaya, who had both died at the age of 17.

Upon completion, King Chulalongkorn (Rama V) named it "Chamai Maru Chet," meaning "two deceased elder brothers who became deities." Chamai is a Khmer word meaning "both" or "twice," while Maru Chet derives from Thai words referring to a deceased brother who is revered as a deity. The bridge was officially opened on January 16, 1902.
