= Suan Chitlada subdistrict =

Suan Chitlada สวนจิตรลดา
- Khwaeng
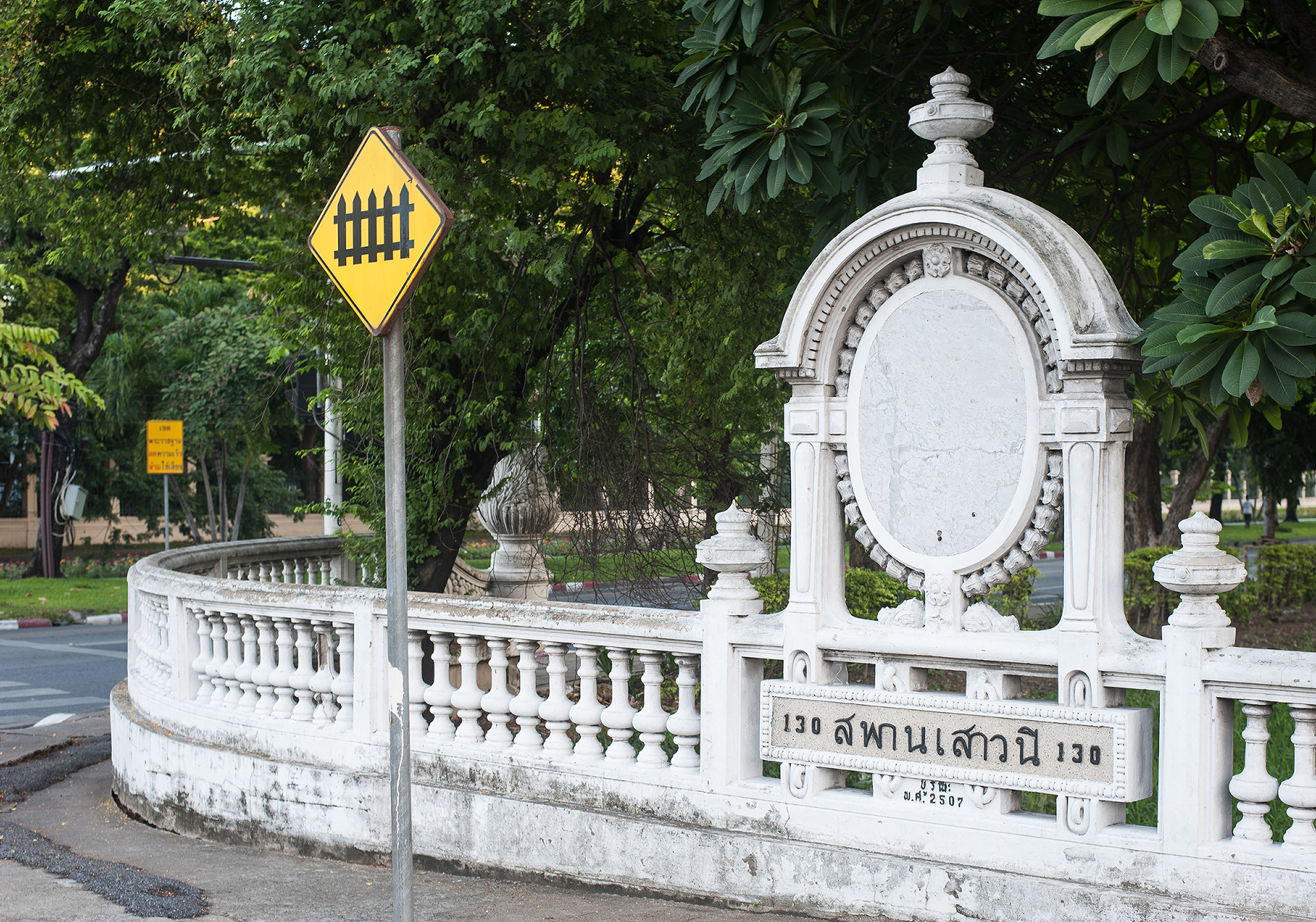
- Saowani Bridge is a historic bridge that spans a ditch and the northern railway tracks at the southern corner of Chitralada Royal Villa, near the border of Ratchathewi District

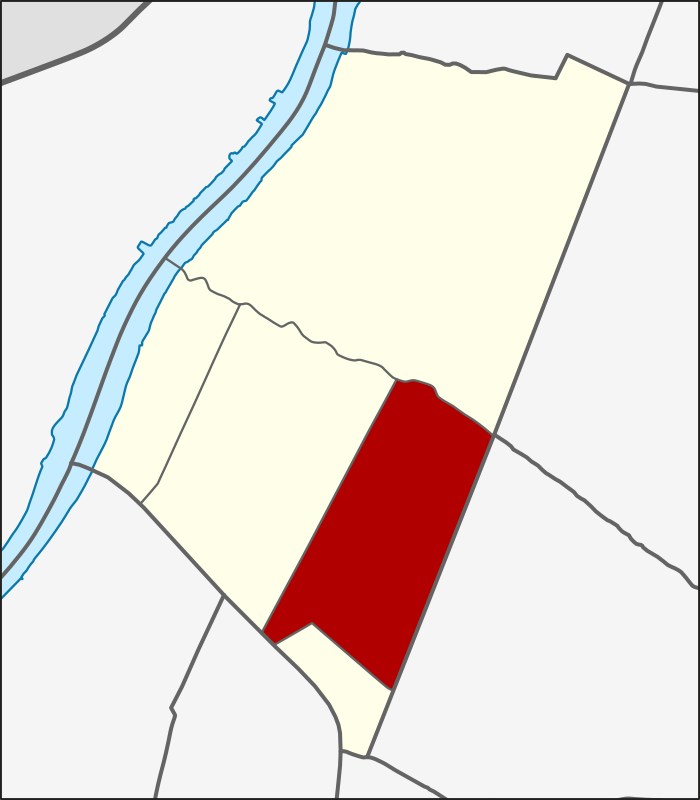
- Location in Dusit District
- Country: Thailand
- Province: Bangkok
- Khet: Dusit

Area
  - Total: 1.737 km^{2} (0.671 sq mi)

Population (2017)
  - Total: 9,211
- Time zone: UTC+7 (ICT)
- Postal code: 10300, 10303
- TIS 1099: 100203

Suan Chitlada (Thai: สวนจิตรลดา; RTGS: Suan Chit Lada) is a khwaeng (subdistrict) of Dusit District, in Bangkok, Thailand.

== Naming ==
Its name refers to Chitralada Royal Villa, that is located in the subdistrict.

== Geography ==
Most of the area of Suan Chitala is the royal court and government offices. It has a total area of 1.737 km^{2} (about 0.671 mi^{2}).

It can be considered in the southeast of the district. The area is bordered by neighbouring subdistricts (from the north clockwise): Thanon Nakhon Chai Si in its district (Khlong Samsen is a borderline), Thung Phaya Thai of Ratchathewi District (Northern railway line is a borderline), Si Yaek Maha Nak in its district, Wat Sommanat of Pom Prap Sattru Phai District (Phitsanulok Road, Nakhon Sawan Road, and Khlong Phadung Krung Kasem are the borderlines), Dusit in its district (Khlong Prem Prachakon is a borderline), respectively.

== Demography ==
In 2017 it had a total population of 9,211 people.

== Places ==
- Chitralada Royal Villa
- King Rama IX Memorial Park (former Nang Loeng Racecours)
- Rajavinit Mathayom School
- Bank for Agriculture and Agricultural Co-operatives
- Rajamangala University of Technology Phra Nakhon, Nang Loeng Campus
- Sirirot Phanitchayakan School
- Wat Sukhantharam

== Transportation ==
- Sukhothai Road
- Rama V Road
- Ratchawithi Road
- Phitsanulok Road
- Nakhon Sawan Road
- Si Ayutthaya Road
- Ramathibodi Hospital Halt
- Chitralada Railway Station
