= Chitralada =

Chitralada or Chitlada (Thai: จิตรลดา) may refer to:

- Chitralada Royal Villa, residence of the late King Bhumibol Adulyadej, part of Dusit Palace in Bangkok, Thailand
- Chitralada railway station, which serves the palace
- Chitralada School, a school associated with the palace
- Suan Chitlada subdistrict, the subdistrict (khwaeng) of Bangkok in which the palace is located.

== See also ==
- Jitlada, a Thai restaurant in Los Angeles, whose Thai name is a homophone
