= RNM =

RNM may refer to:

- Neckargemünd station (DS100 code: RNM), a railway station in Baden-Württemberg, Germany
- Rainham railway station (London) (National Rail station code: RNM), a railway station in London, England
- Rajavinit Mathayom School, a state school in Bangkok, Thailand
- Ramona Airport (FAA LID: RNM), a public airport in California, United States
- Renault–Nissan–Mitsubishi Alliance, a French-Japanese strategic alliance between Renault, Nissan and Mitsubishi Motors
- Republic of North Macedonia, the official name of North Macedonia
