= Thung Phaya Thai =

Coordinates: 13°45′19.7″N 100°31′38.2″E

Thung Phaya Thai ทุ่งพญาไท
- Khwaeng
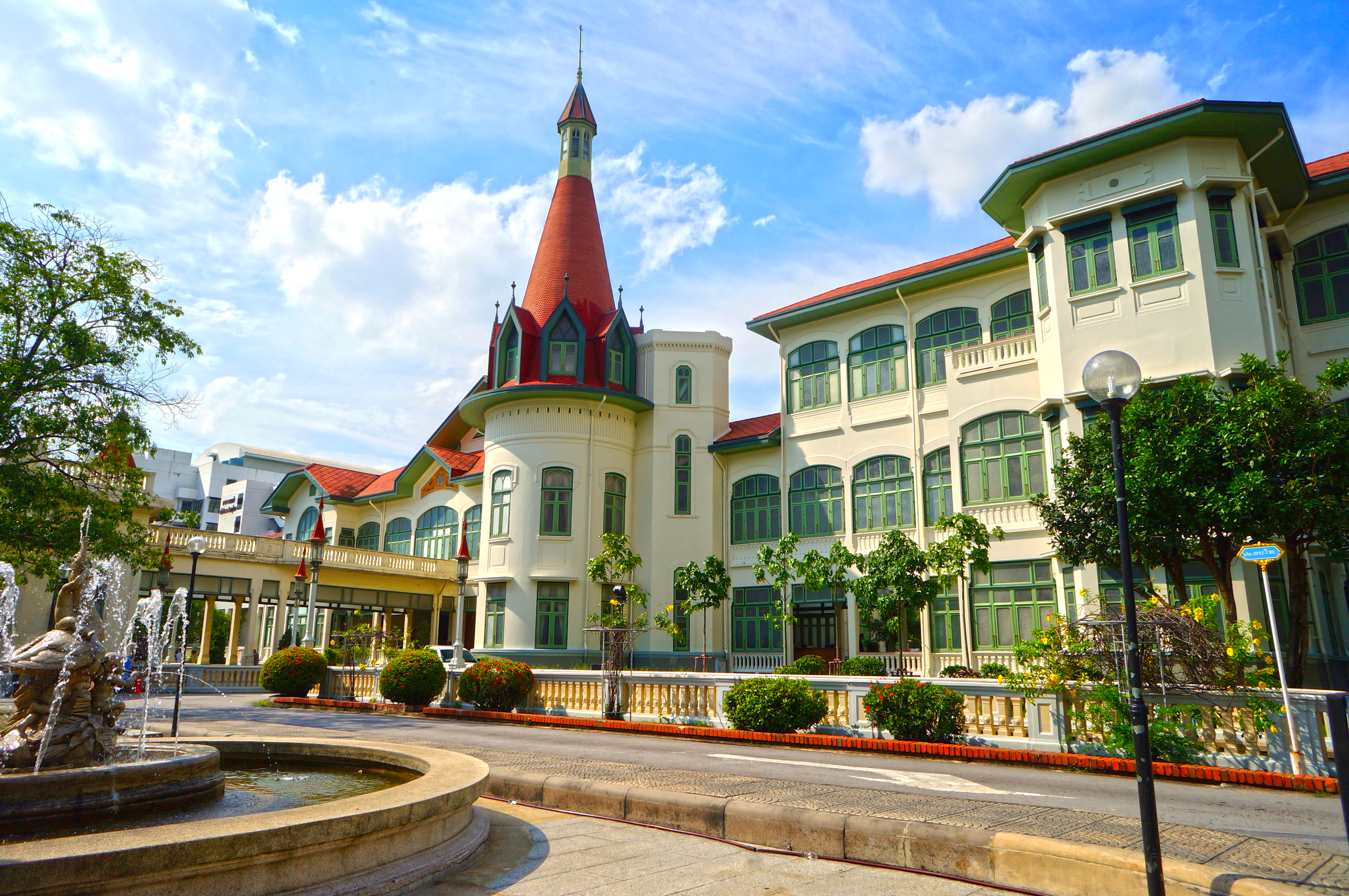
- Phaya Thai Palace

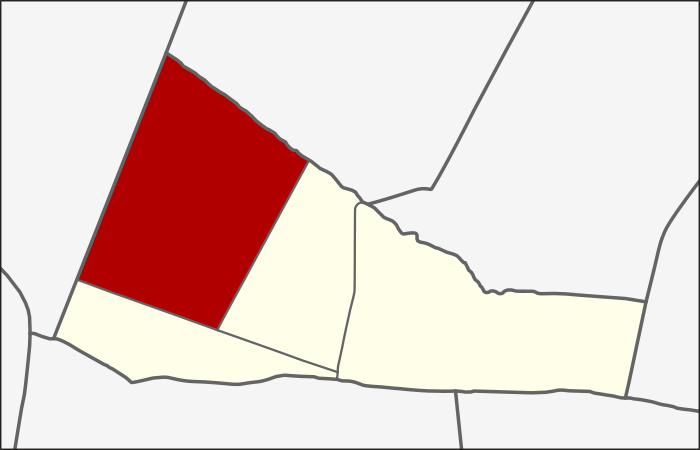
- Location in Ratchathewi District
- Country: Thailand
- Province: Bangkok
- Khet: Ratchathewi

Area
  - Total: 2.559 km^{2} (0.988 sq mi)

Population (2018)
  - Total: 32,744
  - Density: 12,795.62/km^{2} (33,140.5/sq mi)
- Time zone: UTC+7 (ICT)
- Postal code: 10400
- TIS 1099: 103701

Thung Phaya Thai (Thai: ทุ่งพญาไท, pronounced [tʰûŋ pʰā.jāː tʰāj]) is a khwaeng (subdistrict) of Ratchathewi District, downtown Bangkok.

== History ==
This area, formerly known as "Thung Phaya Thai", was once a vast open field within the inner capital. It stretched from the outskirts of Dusit Palace, adjacent to Thung Som Poi (now the site of Chitralada Royal Villa), to what are today the Victory Monument and Phaya Thai Palace. Beyond this lay "Thung Bang Kapi", covering what are now Bang Kapi, Wang Thonglang and Huai Khwang districts.

Although it lay within the city, in the past the atmosphere was that of rural countryside, with fresh, unpolluted air. Khlong Phaya Thai, a canal approximately two km (1.24 mi) in length, flowed through the area.

King Chulalongkorn (Rama V) therefore purchased more than a thousand rai (over 395 acres) of land here. In 1910, he ordered the construction of Phaya Thai Palace along the banks of Khlong Samsen, and also commissioned the building of a road connecting Hua Lamphong Nok Road (now Rama IV Road), passing Pathum Wan Road (now Rama I Road), running parallel to Pra Chae Chin Road (now Phetchaburi Road), crossing the Eastern Railway Line and Duang Tawan Road (now Si Ayutthaya Road), and ending at Pao Road (now Phahonyothin Road). This new road was named "Phaya Thai Road".

The king and his wife, Queen Saovabha Phongsri, used the palace as a royal retreat, and the king also experimented with agricultural cultivation there.

In those days, the palace grounds also served as the venue for the Royal Ploughing Ceremony, an ancient rite held to bless and encourage farmers at the start of the planting season. After King Chulalongkorn's death in 1910, Queen Saovabha Phongsri resided here until her death in 1919.

The area was also home to a Muslim community.

Today, although the open fields have long since vanished and Khlong Phaya Thai has been largely filled in to make way for road construction remaining only as a small waterway within Phramongkutklao Hospital, the name "Thung Phaya Thai" endures, the name "Thung Phaya Thai" endures. Due to successive reorganisations of Bangkok's administrative boundaries, Thung Phaya Thai now forms part of Ratchathewi District.

== Geography ==
The area is bordered by neighbouring subdistricts (from north clockwise): Phaya Thai and, Sam Sen Nai in Phaya Thai District (Khlong Sam Sen is a borderline), Makkasan, and Thanon Phetchaburi in its district (Phaya Thai Road and Si Ayutthaya Road are the borderlines), Suan Chitlada in Dusit District (Northern Railway Line is a borderline).

== Places ==
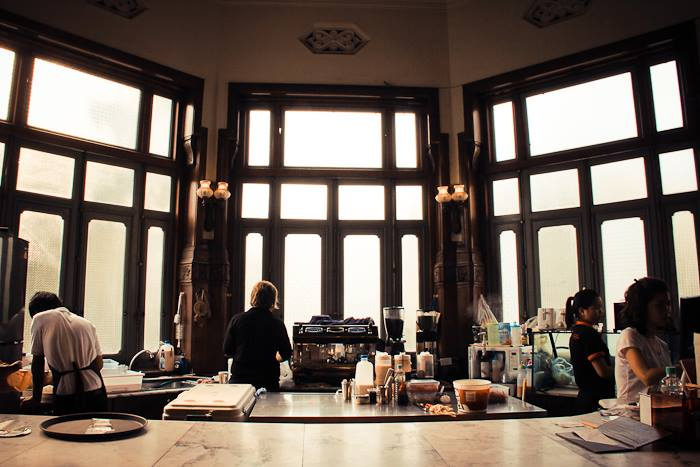
Café de Norasingha, café within Phaya Thai Palace

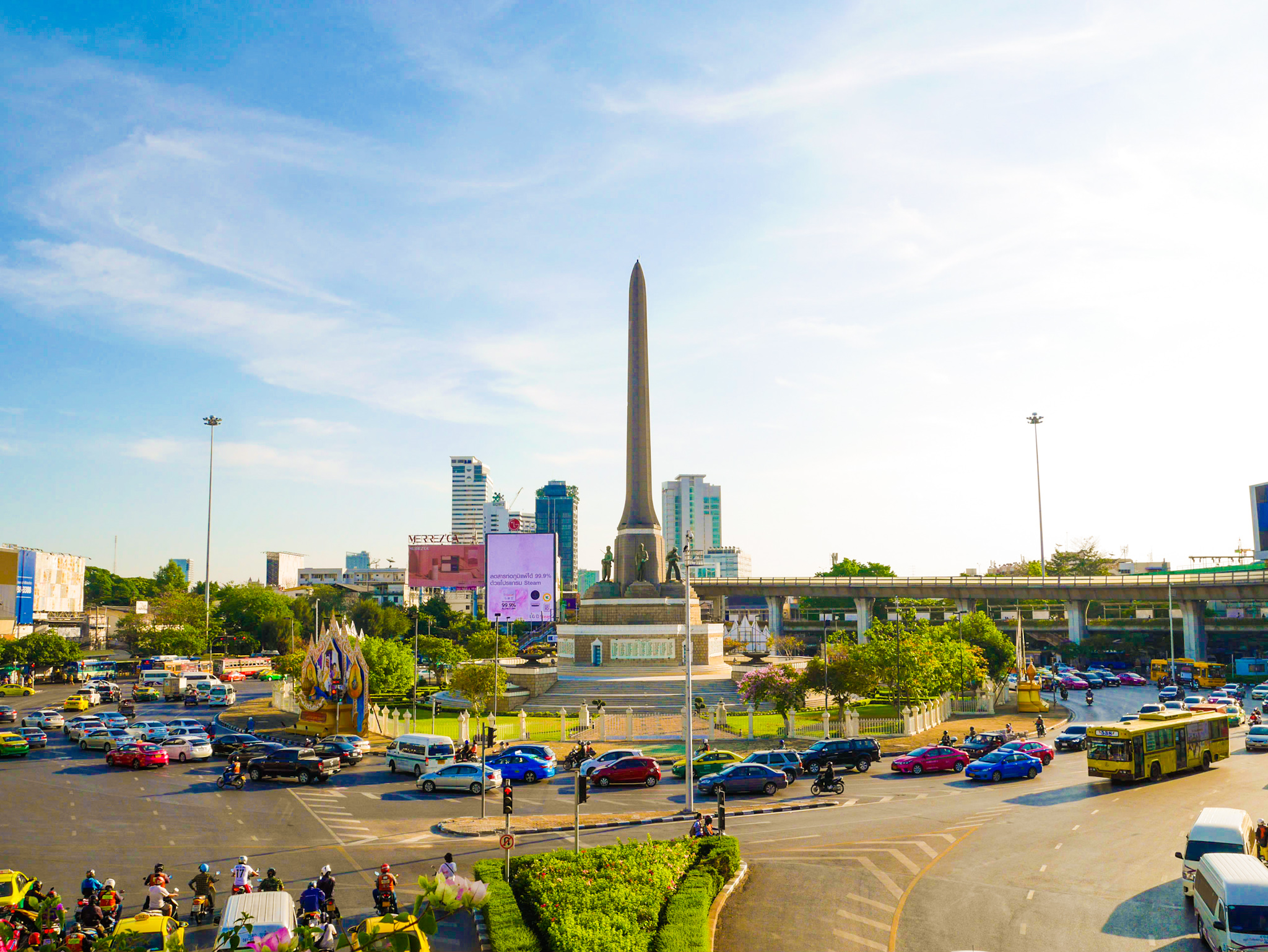
Victory Monument

- Phaya Thai Palace
- Phramongkutklao Hospital
- Victory Monument
- Phyathai 1 Hospital
- Ramathibodi Hospital
- Rajavithi Hospital
- Queen Sirikit National Institute of Child Health (Children Hospital)
- Priest Hospital
- Ratchathewi District Office
- Royal Thai Army Medical Department
- Department of Livestock Development
- Santiphap Park
- King Power Rangnam
- Wat Apai Tharam (Wat Makok)
- Ministry of Foreign Affairs
- Ministry of Industry
- Government Pharmaceutical Organization
- Department of Mineral Resources
- Darul Aman Mosque
- Siam Commercial Bank, Thanon Phetchaburi Branch (now PAfé by Friends in Need (of "PA") Volunteers Foundation, Thai Red Cross)
