= Chitralada railway station =

Railway station in Suan Chitlada, Thailand

Chitralada จิตรลดา
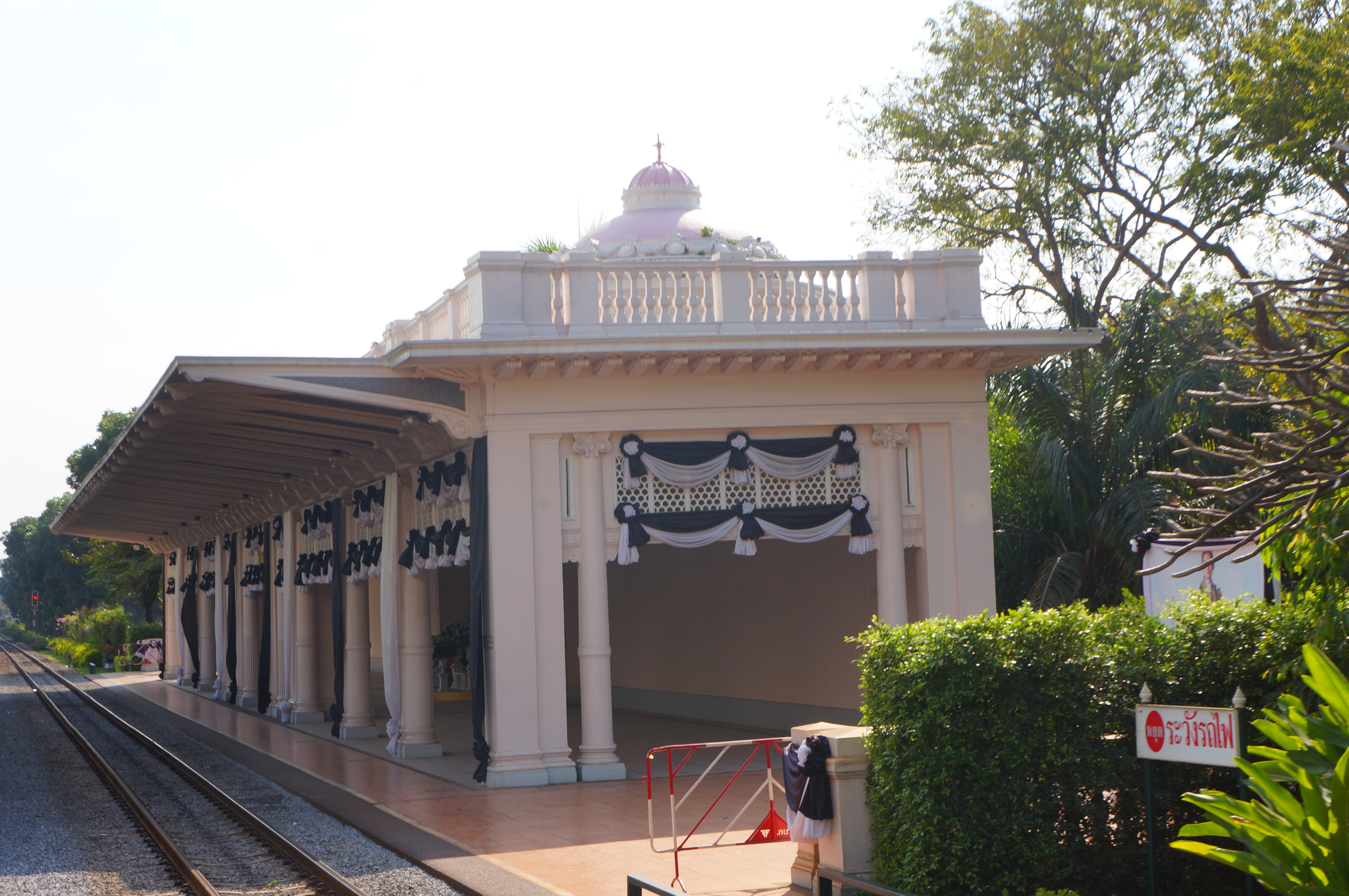

General information
- Other names: Suan Chitralada Royal
- Location: Sawankhalok Rd, Suan Chitlada Subdistrict, Dusit District; Bangkok; Thailand
- Coordinates: 13.76648°N 100.52452°E
- Owner: State Railway of Thailand (SRT)
- Operator: Monarchy of Thailand
- Distance: 3.29 km (2 mi) from Hua Lamphong
- Platforms: 1
- Tracks: 3

Construction
- Structure type: At-grade
- Architectural style: Single-storey brick

Other information
- Status: Royal use only
- Classification: Special

History
- Rebuilt: 1921
Location

Chitralada railway station or Suan Chitralada royal railway station (Thai: สถานีรถไฟจิตรลดา, สถานีรถไฟหลวงสวนจิตรลดา) is a railway station in Thailand, located on Sawankhalok Rd, Suan Chitlada Subdistrict, Dusit District, Bangkok.

It is a special railway station that only serves the royal family when traveling by train. It is located on the side of Sawankhalok Rd, opposite the Chitralada Royal Villa, 3.29 km (2 mi) from Hua Lamphong (Bangkok railway station), considered in the middle between Yommarat and Ramathibodi Hospital halts.

Chitralada railway station was originally a wooden building built in the reign of King Chulalongkorn (Rama V). Later, in the year 1921, during the reign of King Vajiravudh (Rama VI), the construction of a new station was a single-storey brick building. There is a dome that was built according to the Italian Renaissance architecture to replace the original wooden building.
