= King Rama IX Memorial Park =

Under-construction park in Bangkok, Thailand

Coordinates: 13°45′48″N 100°31′03″E

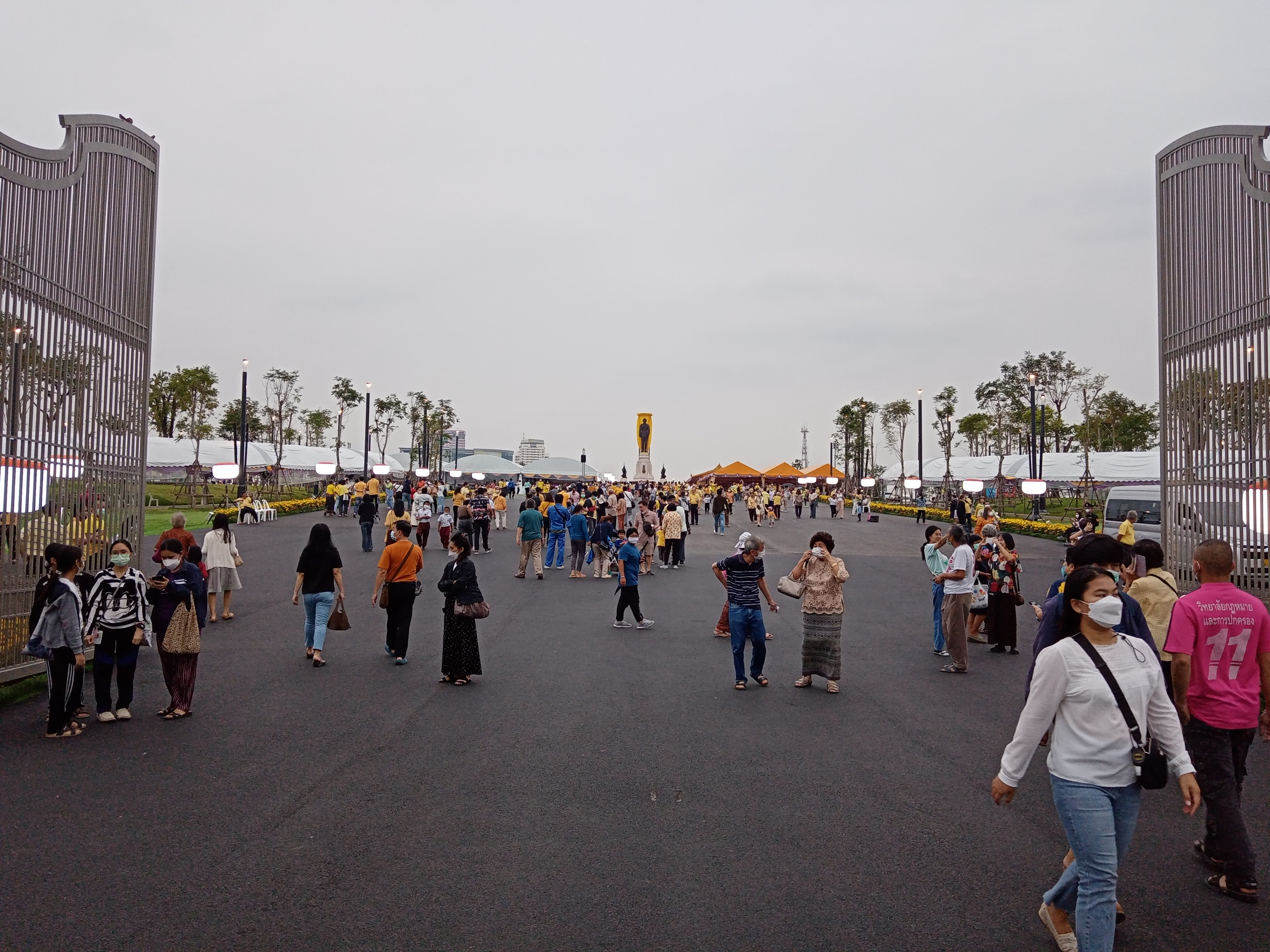
- Location: Dusit, Bangkok, Thailand
- Opening: July 2026

King Rama IX Memorial Park (Note: Thai: อุทยานเฉลิมพระเกียรติพระบาทสมเด็จพระบรมชนกาธิเบศร มหาภูมิพลอดุลยเดชมหาราช บรมนาถบพิตร, RTGS: utthayan chaloem phrakiat phrabat somdet phra maha phumiphon adunyadet maharat barommanatbophit, or อุทยานเฉลิมพระเกียรติฯ รัชกาลที่ 9, utthayan chaloem phrakiat ratchakan thi kao) is a 279-rai (44.6 ha) public park currently under construction in the Dusit district of Bangkok, Thailand. The project was initiated by King Vajiralongkorn (Rama X) to commemorate his father King Bhumibol Adulyadej and mother Queen Sirikit. The park occupies the former grounds of the Royal Turf Club of Thailand, also known as the Nang Loeng Racecourse, the land of which is owned by the Crown Property Bureau, and construction is expected to last until July 2026. The park has as its central feature a large bronze statue of King Bhumibol, which was unveiled by Vajiralongkorn on 13 October 2022, the sixth anniversary of the late king's death.

== Transportation ==
King Rama IX Memorial Park is close to the Yommarat railway halt on the Northern, Northeastern, and Southern lines. It will also be close to the future Yommarat interchange station on the MRT Orange Line and SRT Dark Red Line.

== Gallery ==
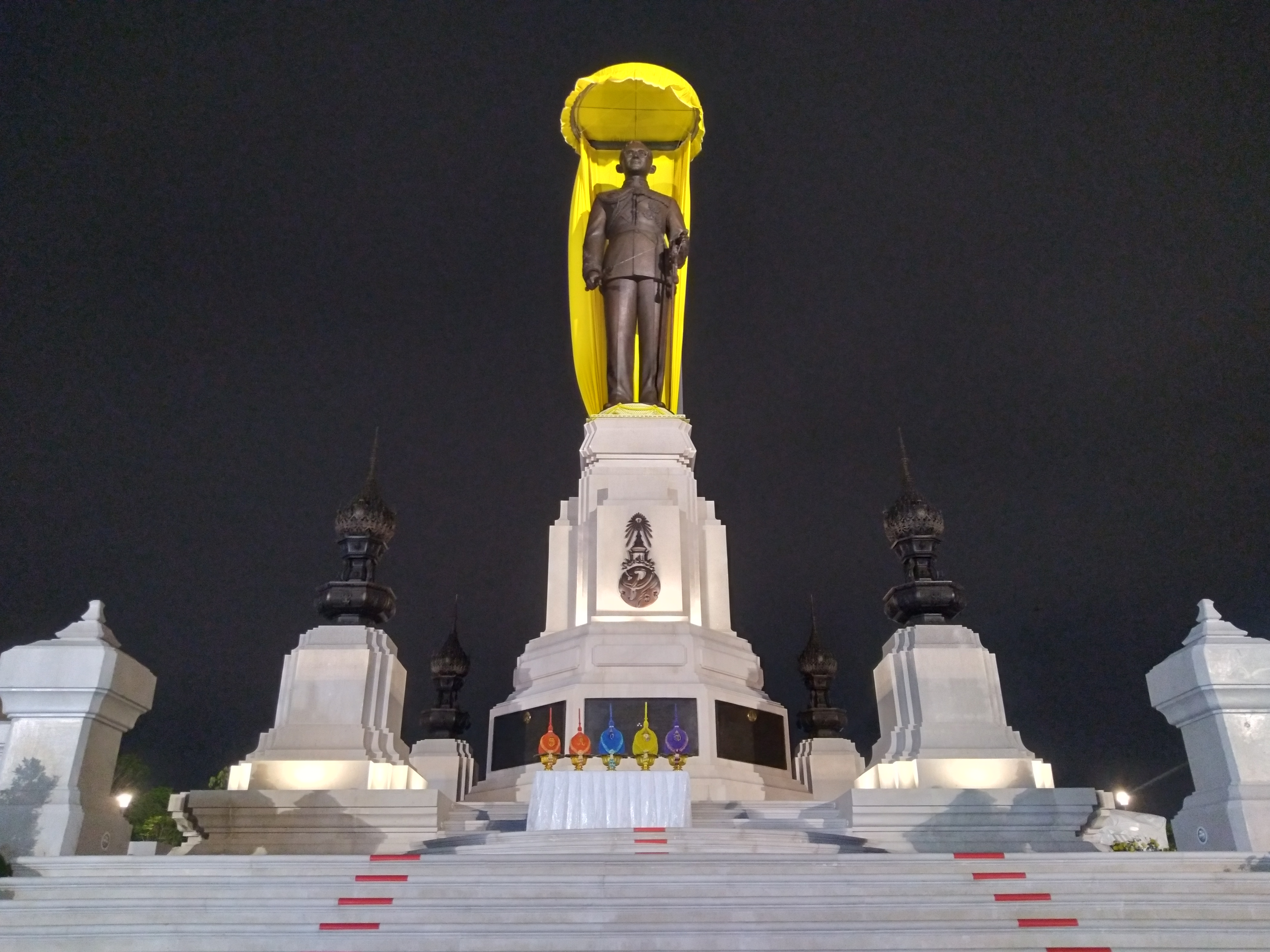
Statue of King Bhumibol Adulyadej Monument

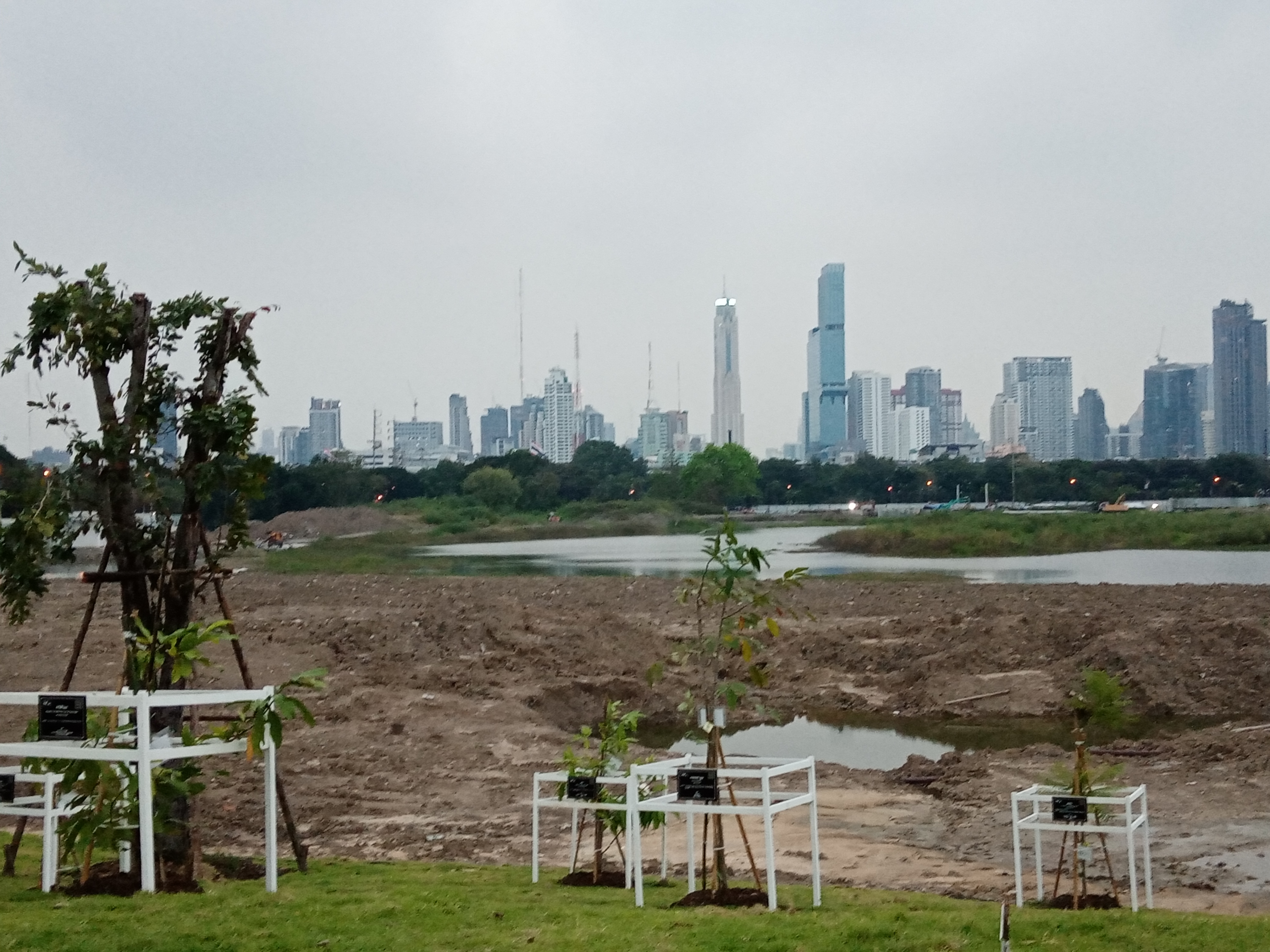
A view inside the park in October 2022 (under construction)

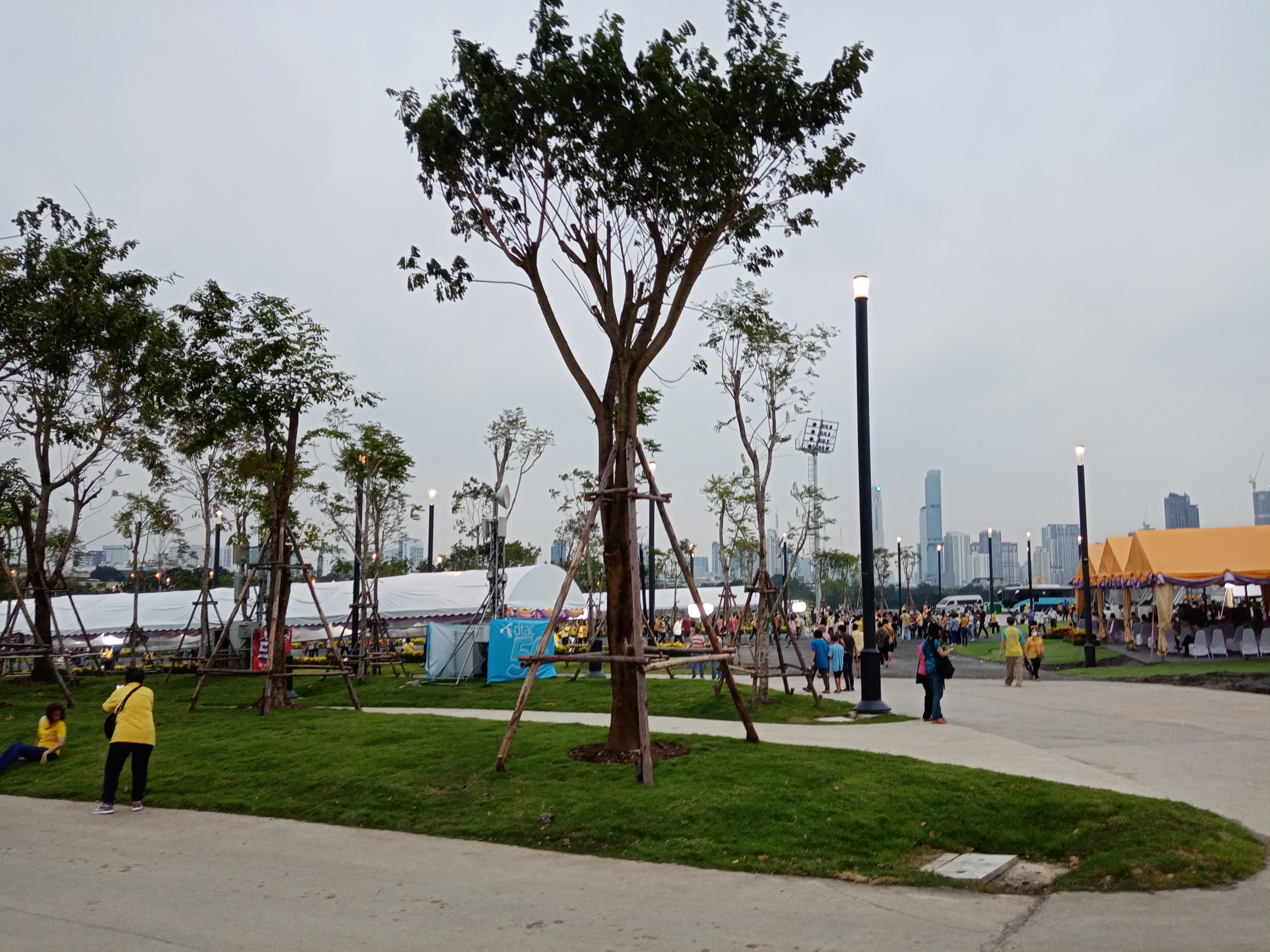
A view inside the park

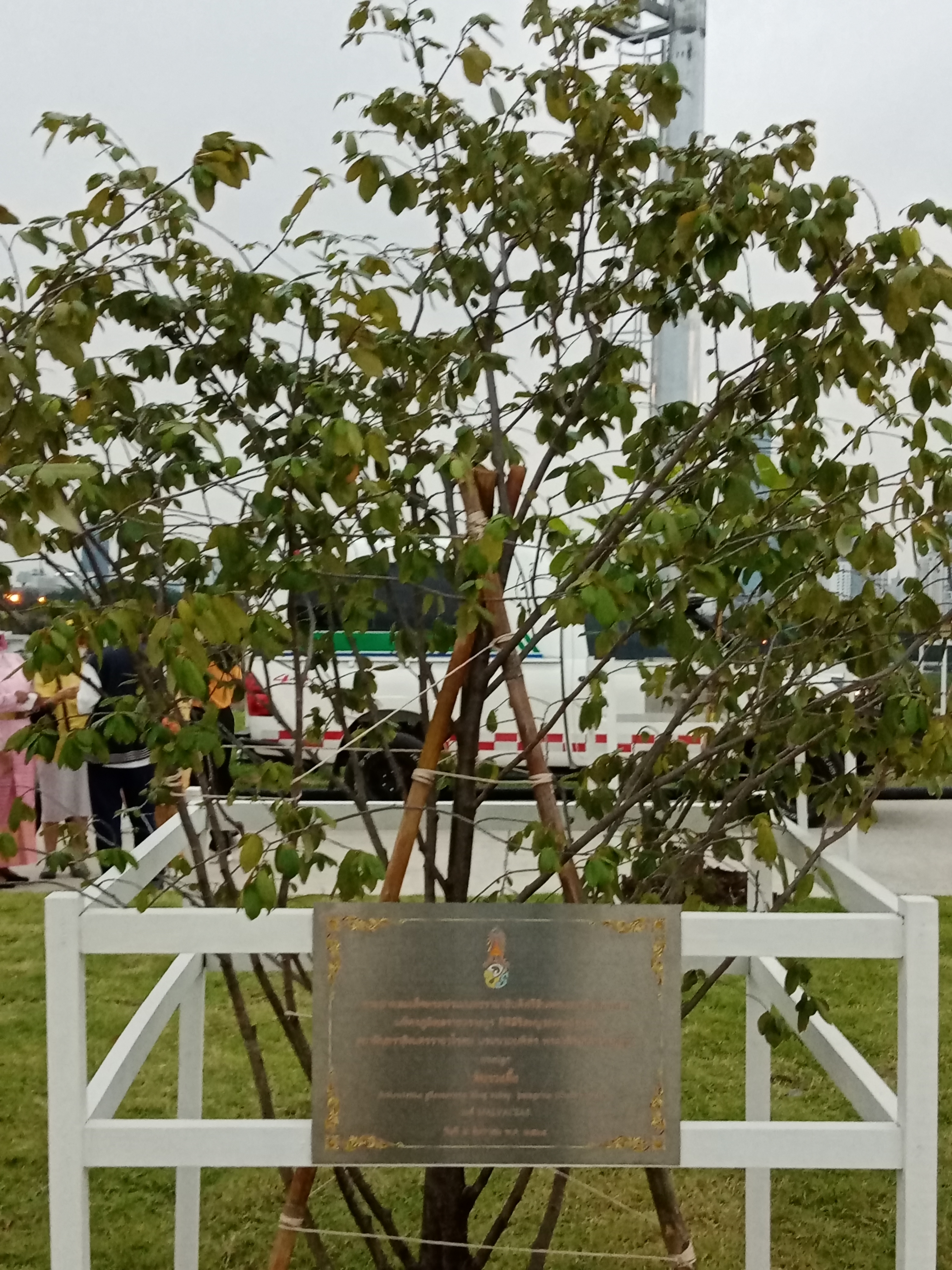
Schoutenia glomerata, planted by King Vajiralongkorn in 2021
