= Ramathibodi Hospital railway halt =

Railway station in Bangkok, Thailand

Coordinates: 13.7678°N 100.5253°E

Ramathibodi Hospital โรงพยาบาลรามาธิบดี

General information
- Location: Kamphaeng Phet 5 Road, Thung Phaya Thai Subdistrict, Ratchathewi District; Bangkok; Thailand
- Operator: State Railway of Thailand
- Manager: Ministry of Transport
- Platforms: 2
- Tracks: 3

Construction
- Structure type: At-grade
- Parking: No
- Accessible: Yes

Other information
- Station code: รธ.
- Classification: Halt

History
- Opened: 2007; 19 years ago

Services
Preceding station	State Railway of Thailand	Following station
Yommarat Halt towards Hua Lamphong	Northern Line	Sam Sen towards Chiang Mai
Yommarat Halt towards Hua Lamphong	Northeastern Line	Sam Sen towards Ubon Ratchathani or Khamsavath (Laos)
Yommarat Halt towards Hua Lamphong	Southern Line	Sam Sen towards Su-ngai Kolok
Location

Ramathibodi Hospital Halt (Thai: ที่หยุดรถโรงพยาบาลรามาธิบดี, RTGS: Thi Yut Rot Rong Phayaban Ramathibodi) is a railway halt in Ratchathewi District, Bangkok. It is served by most commuter and ordinary trains coming to and from Bangkok Hua Lamphong station and one from Rangsit. This halt is located about 3.5 kilometres (2.2 mi) from Bangkok Station and was opened in 2007 to serve the adjacent Ramathibodi Hospital and Faculty of Medicine Ramathibodi Hospital, Mahidol University. It is located next to Chitralada railway station for the Chitralada Royal Villa, which is only used by the Royal Family in traveling by train.
