= Sam Sen railway station =

Railway station in Bangkok, Thailand

Coordinates: 13°46′46″N 100°31′47″E

Sam Sen สามเสน
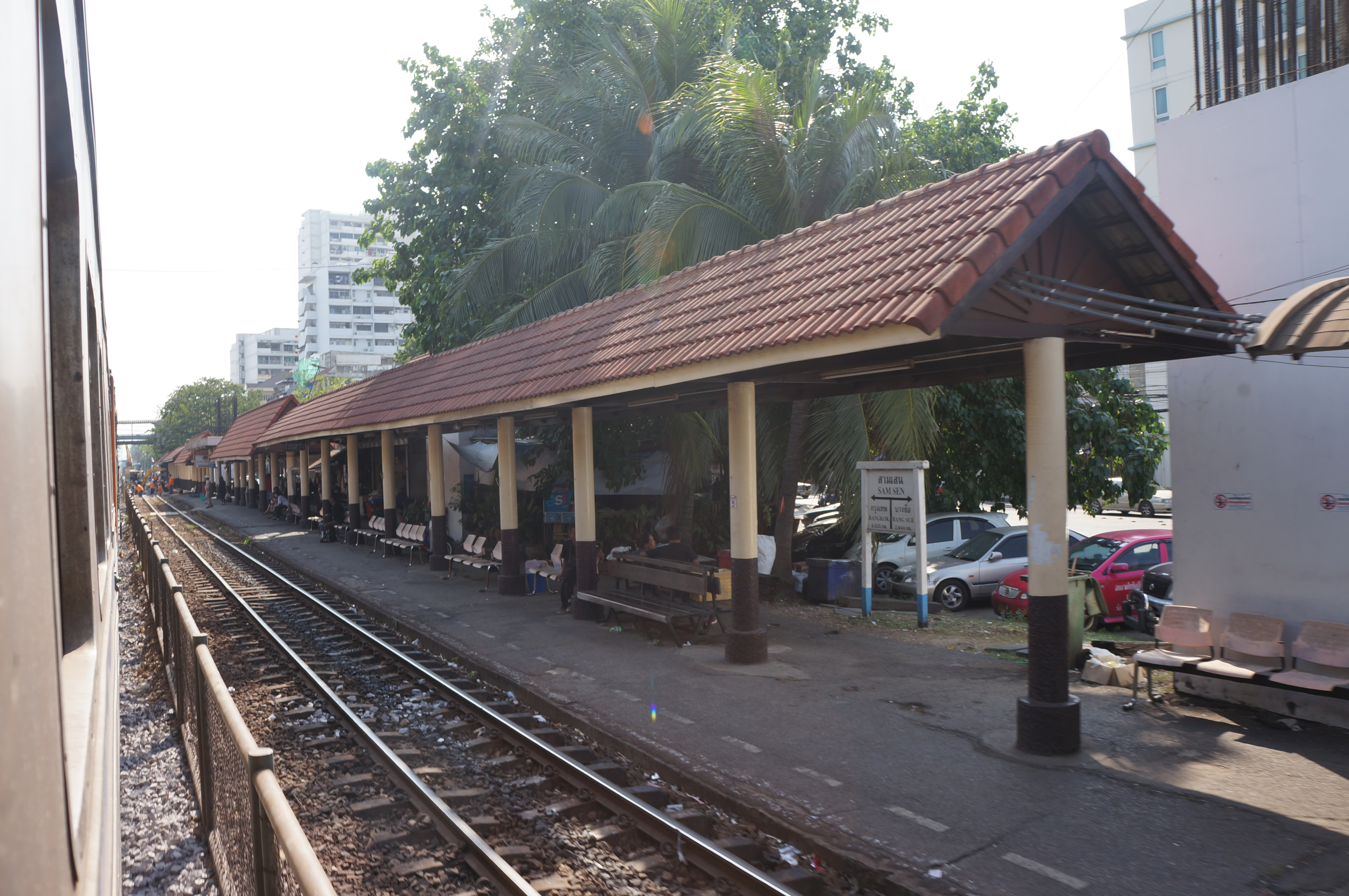

General information
- Location: Thanon Nakhon Chai Si, Dusit and Phaya Thai; Bangkok; Thailand
- Operator: State Railway of Thailand
- Manager: Ministry of Transport
- Platforms: 2
- Tracks: 2
- Connections: Affiliated air-conditioned bus route 9 Taxis / Motorcycle taxi

Construction
- Structure type: At-grade
- Parking: Yes
- Cycle facilities: Yes
- Accessible: Yes

Other information
- Station code: SSN
- Classification: Class 1

History
- Opened: March 1896, 26; 130 years ago
- Rebuilt: 1951; 75 years ago

Passengers
- 3,000–5,000 per day

Services
Preceding station	State Railway of Thailand	Following station
Ramathibodi Hospital Halt towards Hua Lamphong	Northern Line	Bang Sue Junction towards Chiang Mai
Ramathibodi Hospital Halt towards Hua Lamphong	Northeastern Line	Bang Sue Junction towards Ubon Ratchathani or Khamsavath (Laos)
Ramathibodi Hospital Halt towards Hua Lamphong	Southern Line	Bang Sue Junction towards Su-ngai Kolok
Location

Sam Sen railway station (Thai: สถานีรถไฟสามเสน) is a railway station in Bangkok, the capital of Thailand. Owned by the State Railway of Thailand, it is served by the Northern, Northeastern and Southern lines.

Sam Sen station is a Class 1 Station, number code: 1004, English alphabet code: SSN. There are two platforms. Platform 1 is for trains heading to further destinations along the routes. Platform 2 is for trains heading back to Bangkok railway station. It is 4.8 kilometres (3.0 mi) from Bangkok Station. Eighty-six trains serve this station daily including a few excursion trains to Nam Tok and Suan Son Pradipat and some special trains.

== Location ==
Although Sam Sen road does not pass through the area, Sam Sen station takes its name from its position between the Sam Sen side (in Dusit district) and the Phaya Thai side, where Phaya Thai sub-district lies near the Khlong Prapa.

== History ==
Sam Sen station has been in operation since 1896, the very first year of railway service in Thailand, making it one of the country's earliest railway stations. The original station building was mushroom-shaped, remarkable for its distinctive and elegant design, but was later demolished to make way for the Hopewell Project (BERTS) in the 1990s.

The area on the north side of the station later became one of the first protest sites of the People's Democratic Reform Committee (PDRC) against the amnesty bill during the 2013–2014 Thai political crisis, from 31 October to 4 November 2013, before the demonstration moved to Ratchadamnoen Avenue.

During the 1960s to the 2000s, the station served around 3,000 to 5,000 passengers daily. All passenger trains used to stop at this station. In the evenings, the surrounding area became lively, as people came to picnic, play football, or enjoy a game of takraw. In addition, Sam Sen became known as a hub for boxed meals prepared by local vendors, a tradition that continued well beyond the 1980s. However, following the shift of Thailand's main railway hub from Bangkok railway station to Krung Thep Aphiwat Central Terminal in early 2023, Sam Sen has noticeably declined in activity. Today, only a few trains stop here, mostly short-distance services rather than long-distance trains.

== Bus route ==
Affiliated air-conditioned bus no. 9 (Kanlapapruek Depot–Sam Sen Railway Station) is the only bus that runs directly to the station. Its main route passes through Talat Phlu, Wongwian Yai, Pak Khlong Talat, Sanam Luang, Bang Lamphu, Wat Sam Phraya, Thewet, Saint Gabriel's College, and Vajira Hospital.
