= Dusit subdistrict, Bangkok =

Dusit ดุสิต
- Khwaeng
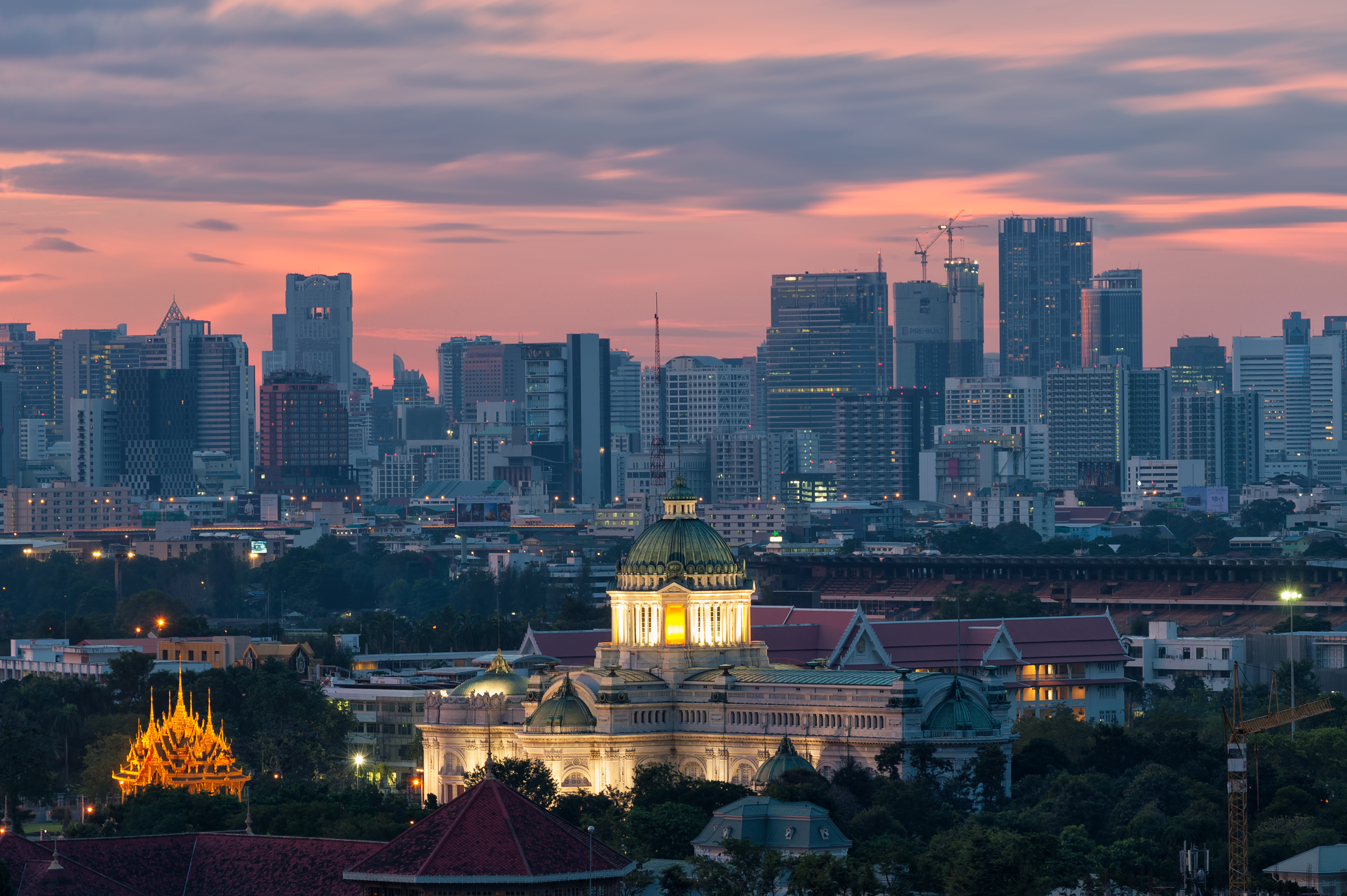
- Ananta Samakhom Throne Hall

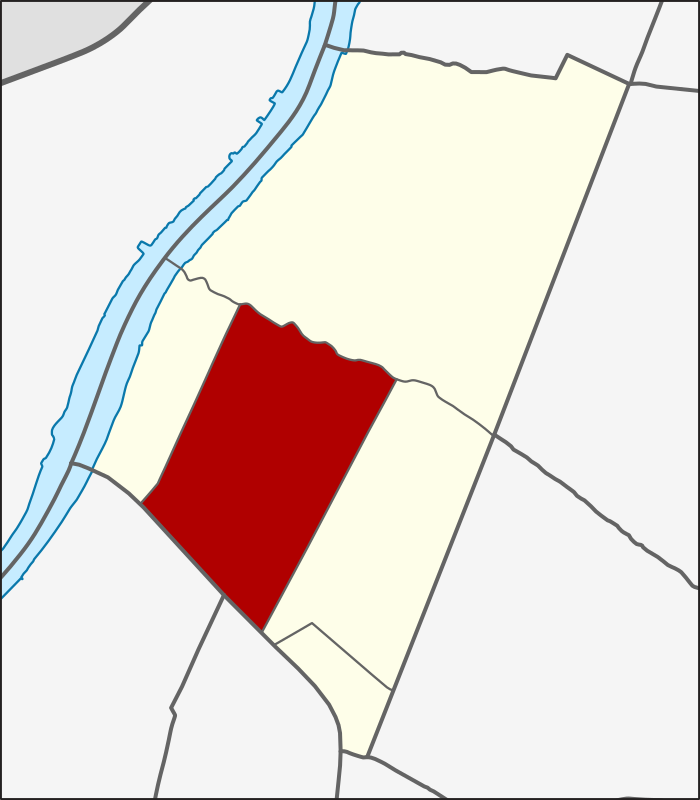
- Location in Dusit District
- Country: Thailand
- Province: Bangkok
- Khet: Dusit

Area
  - Total: 2.233 km^{2} (0.862 sq mi)

Population (2017)
  - Total: 12,792
- Time zone: UTC+7 (ICT)
- Postal code: 10300
- TIS 1099: 100201

Dusit (Thai: ดุสิต; pronounced [dù(ʔ).sìt]) is a khwaeng (subdistrict) of Dusit District, in Bangkok, Thailand.

== Naming ==
Its named after Dusit Palace, that is located in the area.

The word "Dusit", refers to "Tushita", the fourth of six heavenly realm, according to the belief in Buddhist cosmology. The residence of Bodhisattva Svetaketu who believed to have advented as a Buddha on the human world.

== Geography ==
Dusit has a total area of 2.233 km^{2} (about 0.862 mi^{2}), which is the most southern part of the district, and most of the area is the royal court and government offices. It is the site of Dusit District Office.

The area is bordered by neighbouring subdistricts (from the north clockwise): Thanon Nakhon Chai Si in its district (Khlong Samsen is a borderline), Suan Chitlada in its district (Khlong Prem Prachakon is a borderline), Wat Sommanat of Pom Prap Sattru Phai District and Bang Khun Phrom of Phra Nakhon District (Khlong Phadung Krung Kasem is a borderline), Wachiraphayaban in its district (Samsen Road is a borderline).

== Demography ==
In 2017 it had a total population of 12,792 people.
