= Si Ayutthaya Road =

Road in Bangkok, Thailand

Coordinates: 13°45′51.64″N 100°31′20.29″E

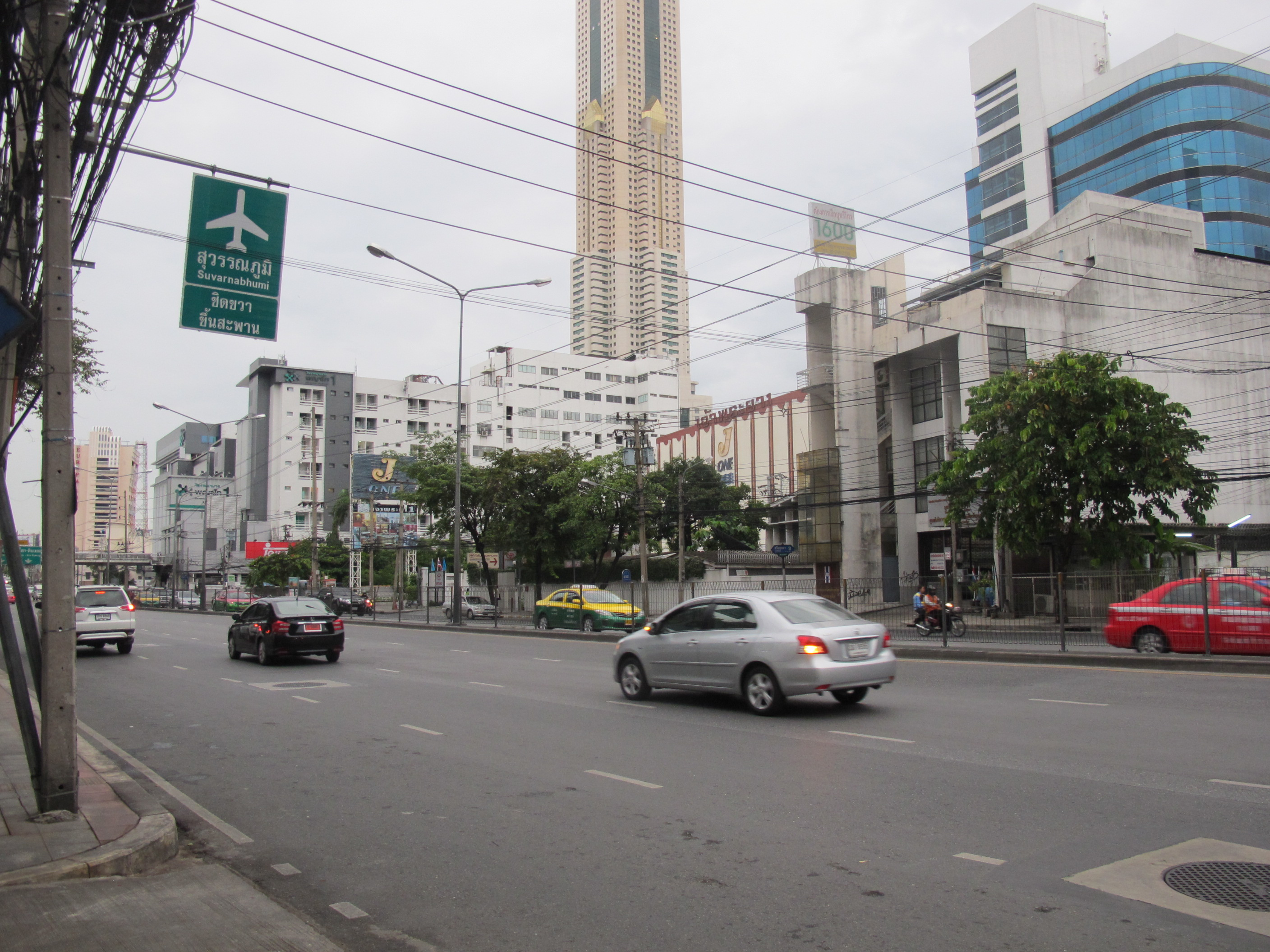
Si Ayutthaya Road in front of Phyathai 1 Hospital near Baiyoke Tower II

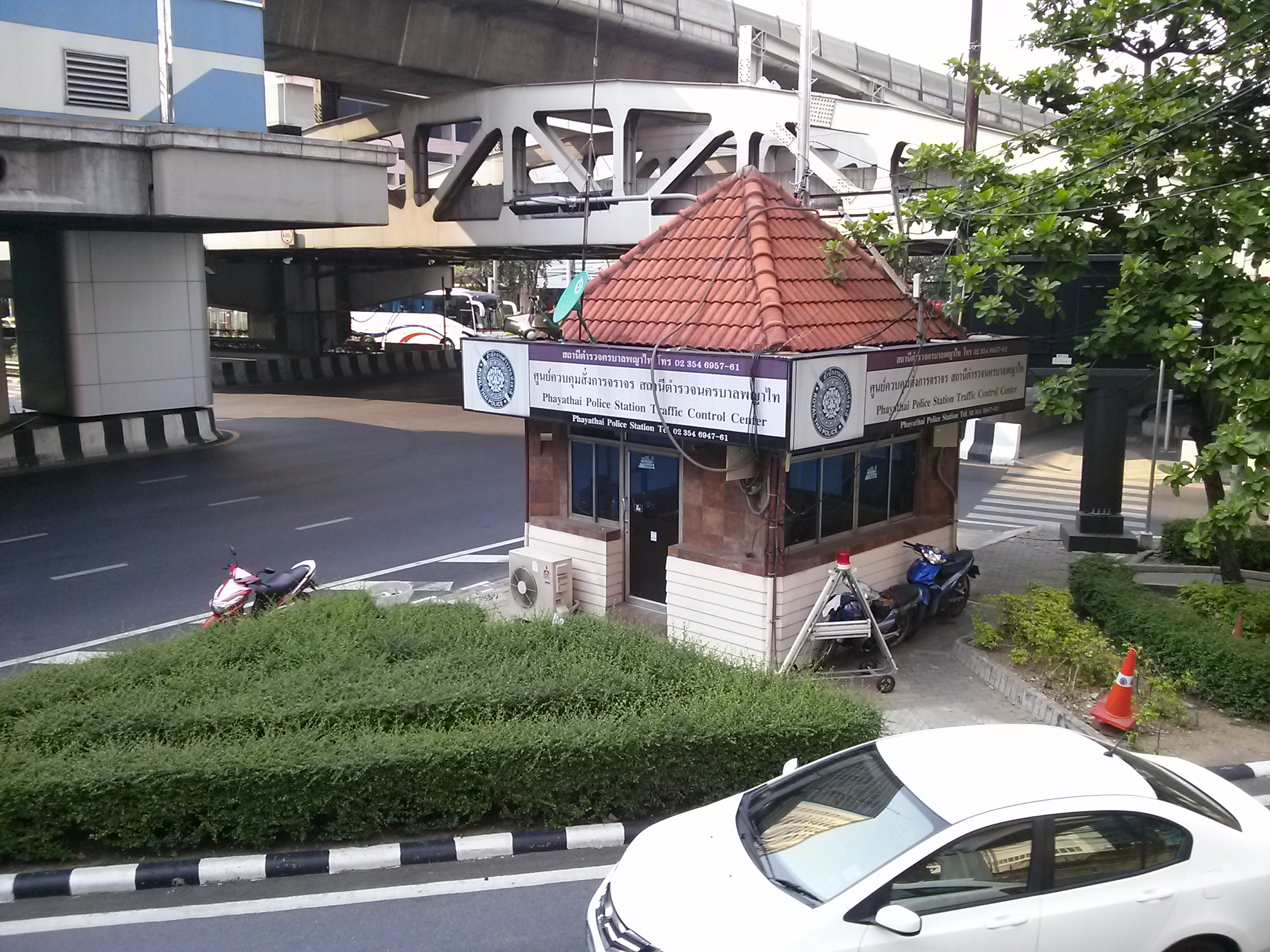
Police box on corner of Phaya Thai intersection, where Si Ayutthaya meets Phaya Thai Roads next to Phaya Thai station

Si Ayutthaya Road (Thai: ถนนศรีอยุธยา, RTGS: Thanon Si Ayutthaya, pronounced [tʰā.nǒn sǐː ʔā.jút.tʰā.jāː]) is a road in inner Bangkok. It starts from Ratchaprarop Road at Makkasan Intersection in the Ratchathewi district and runs eastward, crossing Phaya Thai Road, Rama VI Road, Kamphaeng Phet 5 Road, and the northern railway line. It then enters Dusit district, passing many important sites such as Dusit Palace, Wat Benchamabophit, the Royal Plaza, Paruskavan Palace, before ending at the intersection with Samsen Road near the Chao Phraya River at Si Sao Thewet Intersection.

It was formerly known as Thanon Duang Tawan (ถนนดวงตะวัน, lit. 'Sun Road') and can be divided into three sections: Thanon Duang Tawan Nok (ถนนดวงตะวันนอก, lit. 'Outer Sun Road'), Thanon Duang Tawan Nai (ถนนดวงตะวันใน, lit. 'Inner Sun Road'), and Thanon Duang Na (ถนนดวงตะวันหน้า, lit. 'Front Sun Road'), according to the directions they run. The road was built in 1898, during the reign of King Chulalongkorn (Rama V), alongside Dusit Palace and the surrounding roads. Its name is derived from a type of Chinese ceramic featuring sunrise-from-the-sea motifs, which was one of the most popular collections of that era.

Later, on 6 February 1919, during the reign of King Vajiravudh (Rama VI), he renamed these roads, including Duang Tawan Road. The name "Si Ayutthaya" commemorates his former royal title, "Krom Khun Thep Dvaravati" (Prince of Dvaravati), which refers to the Prince of the Ayutthaya Kingdom.
