= Yommarat railway halt =

Railway stop in Bangkok, Thailand

Coordinates: 13.7592°N 100.5217°E

Yommarat ยมราช
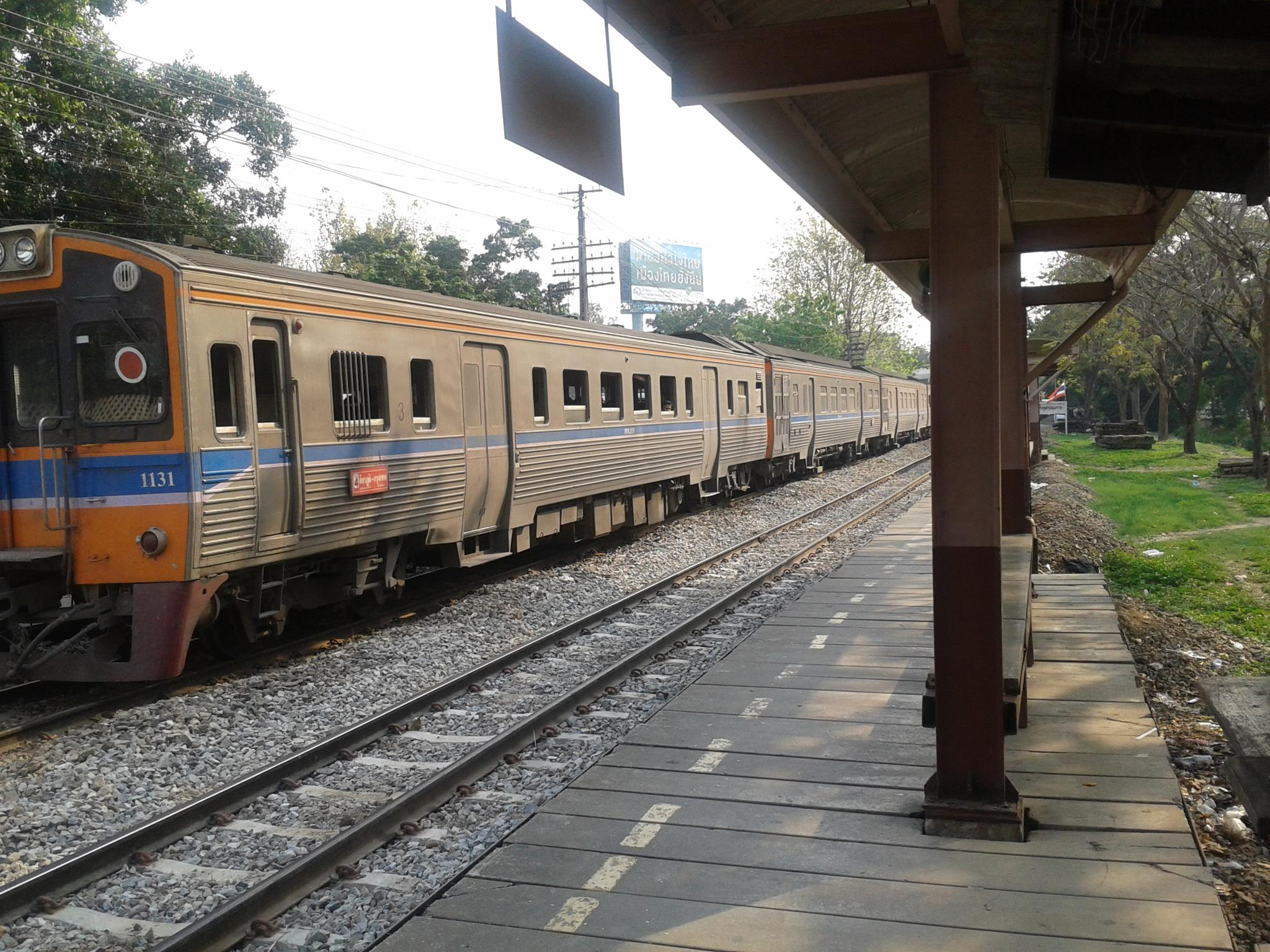

General information
- Location: Sawankhalok Road, Thung Phaya Thai, Ratchathewi; Bangkok; Thailand
- Operator: State Railway of Thailand
- Manager: Ministry of Transport
- Platforms: 2
- Tracks: 2

Construction
- Structure type: At-grade
- Parking: No
- Cycle facilities: Yes

Other information
- Station code: ยช.
- Classification: Halt

History
- Rebuilt: 2017; 9 years ago

Services
Preceding station	State Railway of Thailand	Following station
Hua Lamphong Terminus	Northern Line	Ramathibodi Hospital Halt towards Chiang Mai
Hua Lamphong Terminus	Northeastern Line	Ramathibodi Hospital Halt towards Ubon Ratchathani or Khamsavath (Laos)
Hua Lamphong Terminus	Southern Line	Ramathibodi Hospital Halt towards Su-ngai Kolok
Location

Yommarat railway halt (Thai: ที่หยุดรถไฟยมราช) is a railway halt in Bangkok. It is owned and operated by State Railway of Thailand and serves the Northern, Northeastern, and Southern Lines. It is on Sawankhalok Road in Thung Phaya Thai, Ratchathewi District, Bangkok, to the north of Yommarat level-crossing. The trains that stop at this station are only commuter services and some ordinary services. Not far from the halt is Uruphong Halt, a separate halt for the Eastern Line. Yommarat was refurbished since 2017 and was used as an access point for railway passengers to the Royal Crematorium during the death and funeral of King Bhumibol Adulyadej.

It will be relocated a bit further north to service the SRT Red Lines Project and handle trains coming from Phaya Thai.
