= Rajavinit Mathayom School =

Coordinates: 13.7598°N 100.5178°E

- โรงเรียนราชวินิต มัธยม
- Dusit, Bangkok; Thailand

Information
- Type: Public, Co-education, Day school
- Motto: Good Education, Be Disciplined, Pursuing Activities
- Established: April 4, 1978
- Founder: King Bhumibol Adulyadej
- Authority: Office of the Basic Education Commission
- Grades: 7–12
- Enrolment: 2,373 (2012)
- Campus type: Urban
- Colours: White and Blue-black
- Nickname: RNM
- Website: http://www.rnm.ac.th

Rajavinit Mathayom School (RNM) (Thai: โรงเรียนราชวินิต มัธยม, is a state school located in Bangkok, Thailand.

== History ==
The school was built on land given by King Bhuipol, about 2.5 acres (1.0 ha) at the corner of Rama V Road and Pitsanuloke Road. The land used to be the location of the Royal Stables of King Vajiravudh. The school serves students who finish their primary education at Rajavinit School and the children of those who work in the Royal Household Bureau.

The school's name means "a place for training children of secondary level to be good citizens of His Majesty".

On April 4, 1978 the Ministry of Education announced the establishment of the school.

== Awards ==
- Marching band of Rajavinit Mathayom School 1998
- King's Cup for Marching Band 1998
- HRH Crown Prince Cup at Siam Crown Pediatrics 1996 and 2000
- Winner of Singapore MUSE Festival in Singapore twice
- Winner of 21st Century Art Festival in china twice
- Winner of Beijing International Music Competition in China
- Gold Medal of World Wind Symphony Competition in New York, USA

== School tree ==
Tabebuia rosea

== Sport ==
The Five Sporting Houses are:

- Morakot, also known as Emerald (Green)
- Petai, also known as Zircon (Pink)
- Pailin, also known as Sapphire (Blue)
- Gomen, also known as Garnet (Red)
- Bussarakam, also known as Topaz (Yellow)

== Directors of the school ==
- คุณหญิงพวงรัตน วิเวกานนท์
- คุณหญิงสมจินตนา ภักดิ์ศรีวงศ์
- นางสาวสุวรรณา เอมประดิษฐ์
- นางสาวสุกัญญา สันติพัฒนาชัย
- นางสาวจริมศรี เพ็ชรกุล
- นายไพรัช กรบงกชมาศ
- ด.ร.บุญธรรม พิมภาภรณ์

== Notable alumni ==
- Petai Ploymeka - Thai singer and actor.
- Putthipat Kulprechaseth - Thai singer.
