= Dusit district =

Dusit ดุสิต
- Khet
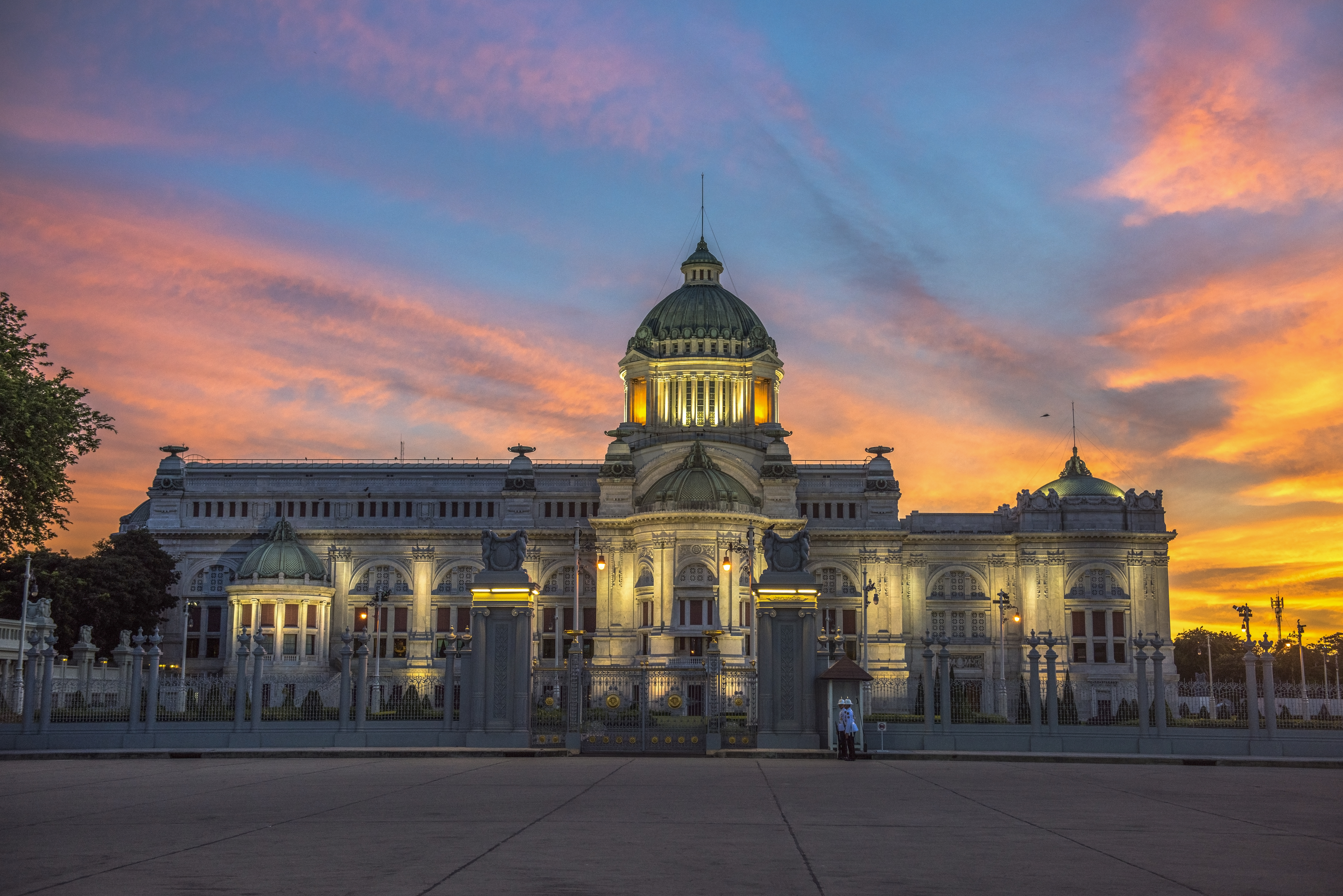
- Ananta Samakhom Throne Hall in 2017

- Khet location in Bangkok
- Coordinates: 13°46′37″N 100°31′14″E
- Country: Thailand
- Province: Bangkok
- Seat: Dusit
- Khwaeng: 5

Area
  - Total: 10.7 km^{2} (4.1 sq mi)

Population (2017)
  - Total: 95,852
  - Density: 8,958.13/km^{2} (23,201.5/sq mi)
- Time zone: UTC+7 (ICT)
- Postal code: 10300
- Geocode: 1002

Dusit (Thai: ดุสิต, pronounced [dù(ʔ).sìt]) is one of the 50 districts (khet) of Bangkok, Thailand.

The district is the administrative centre of the kingdom, as both the National Assembly and Dusit Palace are in the district, as are several ministries. It is connected to Rattanakosin Island by Ratchadamnoen Avenue (literally, 'royal way for travelling').

Neighbouring districts are, clockwise from north, Bang Sue, Phaya Thai, Ratchathewi, Pathum Wan, Pom Prap Sattru Phai, Phra Nakhon, and across the Chao Phraya River, Bang Phlat.

== History ==
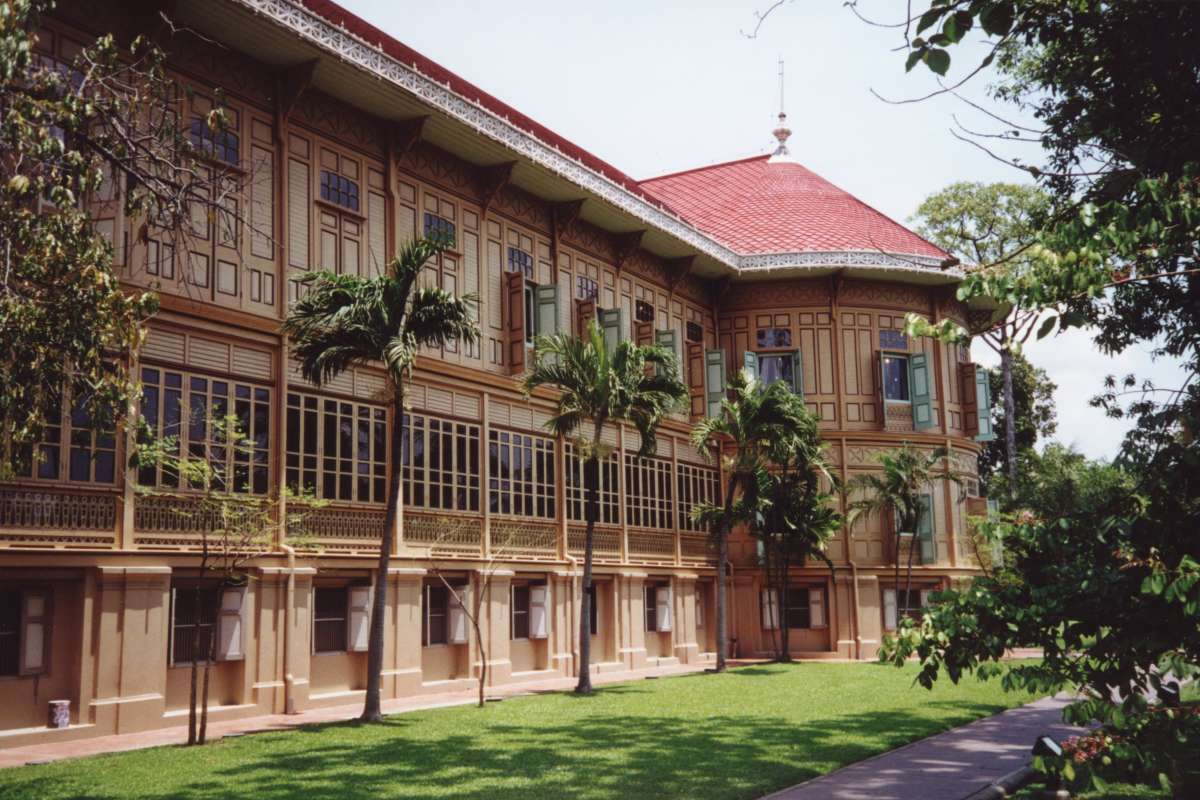
Vimanmek Mansion

The district was established by King Chulalongkorn, who wanted to escape the confines of Rattanakosin Island. The king began with the construction of a new palace compound called the Dusit Palace in 1890s, slowly adding many new residences and mansions into its grounds. This included the Vimanmek Mansion which was constructed in 1900 completely out of teak, and was used as a royal palace for a short time, but was abandoned in 1908. Reconstructed in 1992, it was a major tourist attraction until its closure in 2018. The Amphorn Sathan Residential Hall was completed in 1906, and became the main residential palace of the king. The pathway connecting the Grand Palace to Dusit Palace eventually became Ratchadamnoen Avenue.

The construction of both Dusit Palace and Ratchadamnoen Avenue allowed and encouraged the expansion of Bangkok outside its city walls and the traditional confines of the Rattanakosin area. The palace expanded Bangkok northwards, while the avenue accommodated further growth. The avenue extended from the palace, starting in front of the Ananta Samakhom Throne Hall and the Royal Plaza southwards along the Makawan Rangsant and Phanfah Lielas Bridges then westward across the Phanbipob Liela Bridge, then south again long the Sanam Luang to the Grand Palace.

The Chitralada Royal Villa was built by King Vajiravudh (Rama VI), and was a residence of King Bhumibol Adulyadej. The large park around the palace was used by the king for agricultural research.

In September 2025, there was a road collapse in the Dusit district with a major sinkhole on Samsen Road between the Samsen Police Station and Vajira Hospital.

== Buildings ==
Important buildings in the district include Ananta Samakhom Throne Hall, which was another former residence of King Chulalongkorn, and was later used as the first parliament building. It was built 1907–1915 by the Italian architects, Annibale Rigotti and Mario Tamagno. Next to the throne hall is the Amphorn Sathan Residential Hall, the official residence of the current monarch King Vajiralongkorn.

Next to the building is Suan Amporn Park, and across the street Dusit Zoo, the first zoo in Thailand (moved to Pathum Thani since the end of September 2018). The vast space in front of Ananta Samakom Throne Hall is the Royal Plaza. At the middle of the plaza is the equestrian statue of King Chulalongkorn. Various events are held in Suan Amporn Park and Royal Plaza. Yearly events include commencements of many universities in Bangkok, and the Red Cross Fair which takes place for nine days from the end of March to the first week of April.

Important government buildings such as the Government House and Phitsanulok Mansion are also in Dusit. Wasukri Pier is the pier to board and store royal barges, which sail in Thailand's Royal Barge Procession. Near the pier is the National Library of Thailand. Additionally, it is also home to several military camps: 1st Cavalry Regiment, King's Guard; 4th Cavalry Division, King's Guard; 1st Field Artillery Battalion, King's Guard; Air Defense Artillery Division; Department of Army Transportation; Army Ordnance Department; Army Ordnance Learning Center; Command And General Staff College; and some parts of Royal Thai Air Force (RTAF) such as the Directorate of Aeronautical Engineering. For this reason, Dusit has long been known politically as the "Military Zone".

Since 1932 the National Assembly has been situated somewhere within the district. From 1932 to 1974 the legislature met at the Ananta Samakhom Throne Hall. From 1974 the legislature moved to a purposefully built Parliament House (next to the Dusit Palace complex) and met there until 2018. Then it was moved again to a new building named the Sappaya-Sapasathan in the Kiakkai neighbourhood in the north of the district.

Several other palaces have been converted into facilities for other purposes. Chan Kasem Palace was initially built for the crown prince by King Rama V, but was never used by King Rama VI and later became the office of the Ministry of Education. Suan Sunandha Palace was built for the queen, consorts, princes and princesses, but is now home to Suan Sunandha Rajabhat University.

The most famous Buddhist temple of the district is Wat Benchamabophit, built by Prince Naris as the royal temple of King Chulalongkorn.

District map

== Transport ==
=== Train ===
The Bang Sue MRT Station of the MRT is a short distance outside Dusit District at its extreme northeast corner, in Bang Sue District.

The Yommarat Railway Halt of the SRT is on the border of Dusit and Ratchathewi Districts.

The Sam Sen Railway Station of the SRT is on the border of Dusit and Phaya Thai Districts.

=== Water taxis ===
Dusit District Chao Phraya Express Boat piers are Thewet Pier, Payap Pier, Irrigation Dept. Pier, Kheaw Khai Ka Pier, and Kiak Kai Pier.

== Administration ==
The district is divided into five sub-districts (khwaeng):

1.	Dusit	ดุสิต
2.	Wachiraphayaban	วชิรพยาบาล
3.	Suan Chitlada	สวนจิตรลดา
4.	Si Yaek Maha Nak	สี่แยกมหานาค
5.	Thanon Nakhon Chai Si	ถนนนครไชยศรี

== Gallery ==
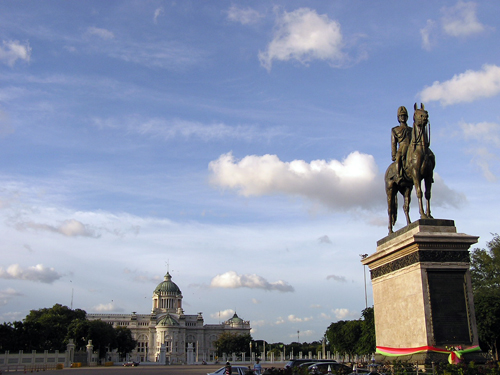
Equestrian statue of King Chulalongkorn and Royal Plaza in front of Ananta Samakhom Throne Hall

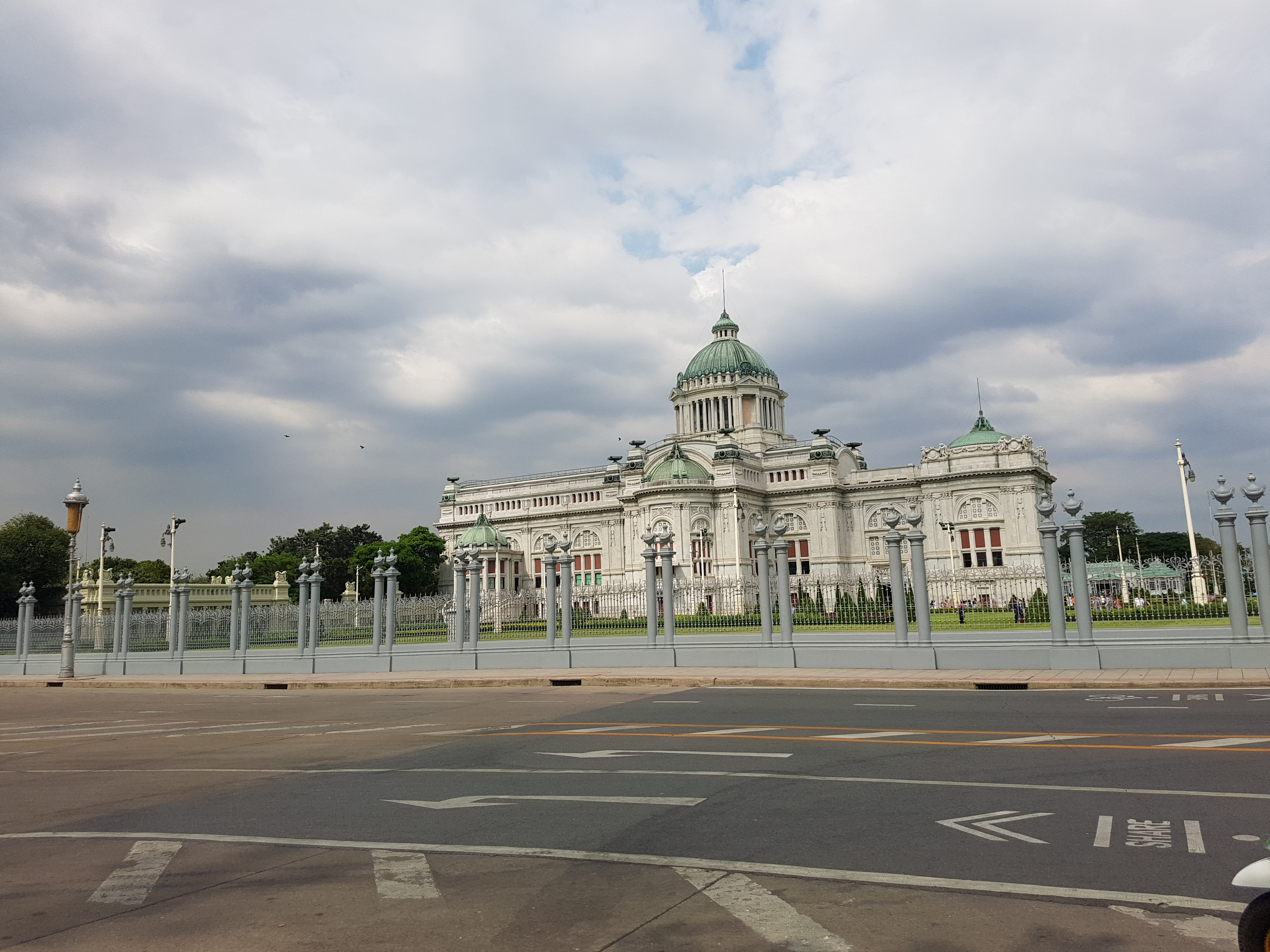
Uthong Nai Road beside Ananta Samakhom Throne Hall

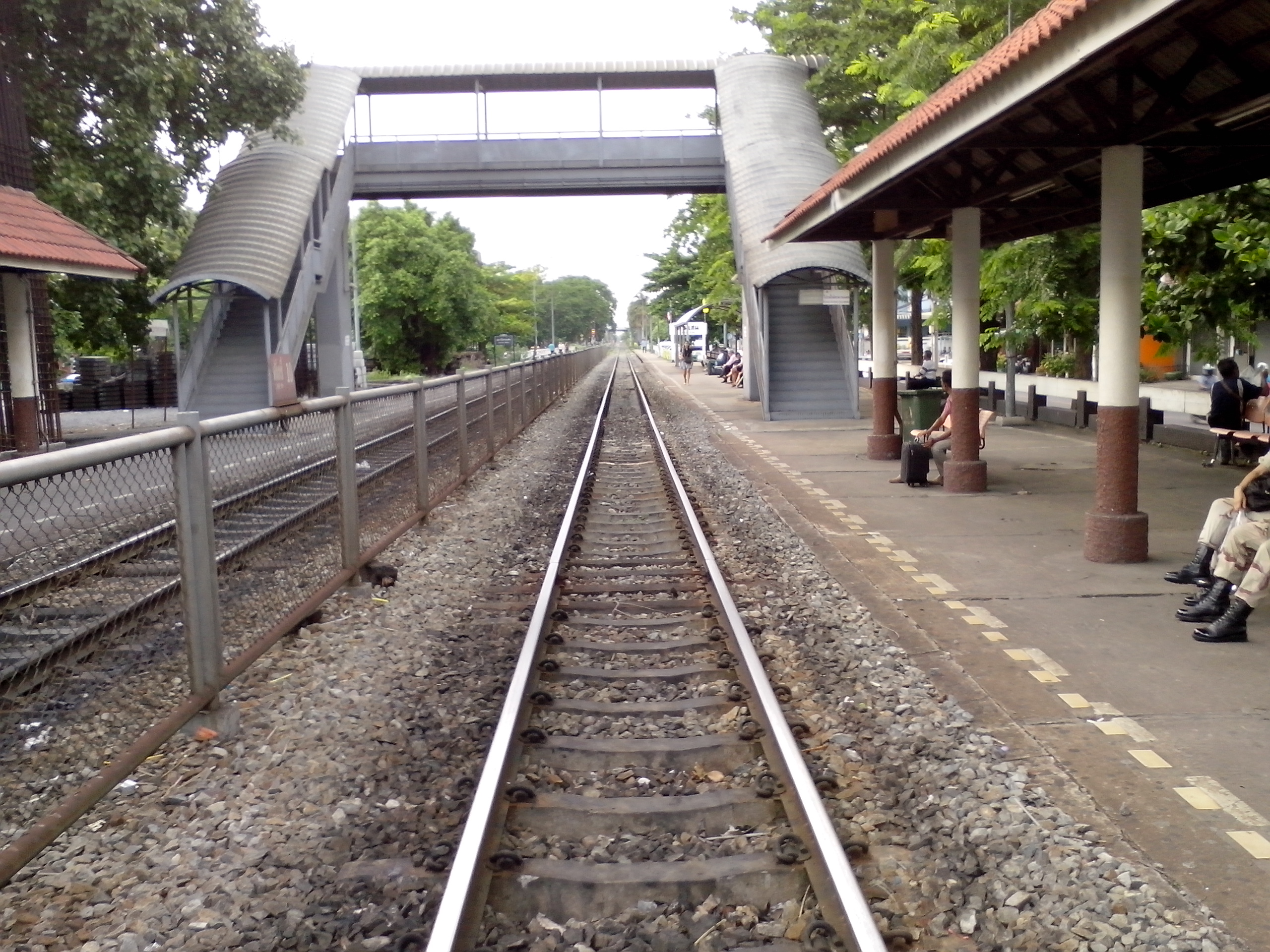
Sam Sen Railway Station view toward Hua Lamphong (right is Dusit, left is Phaya Thai)

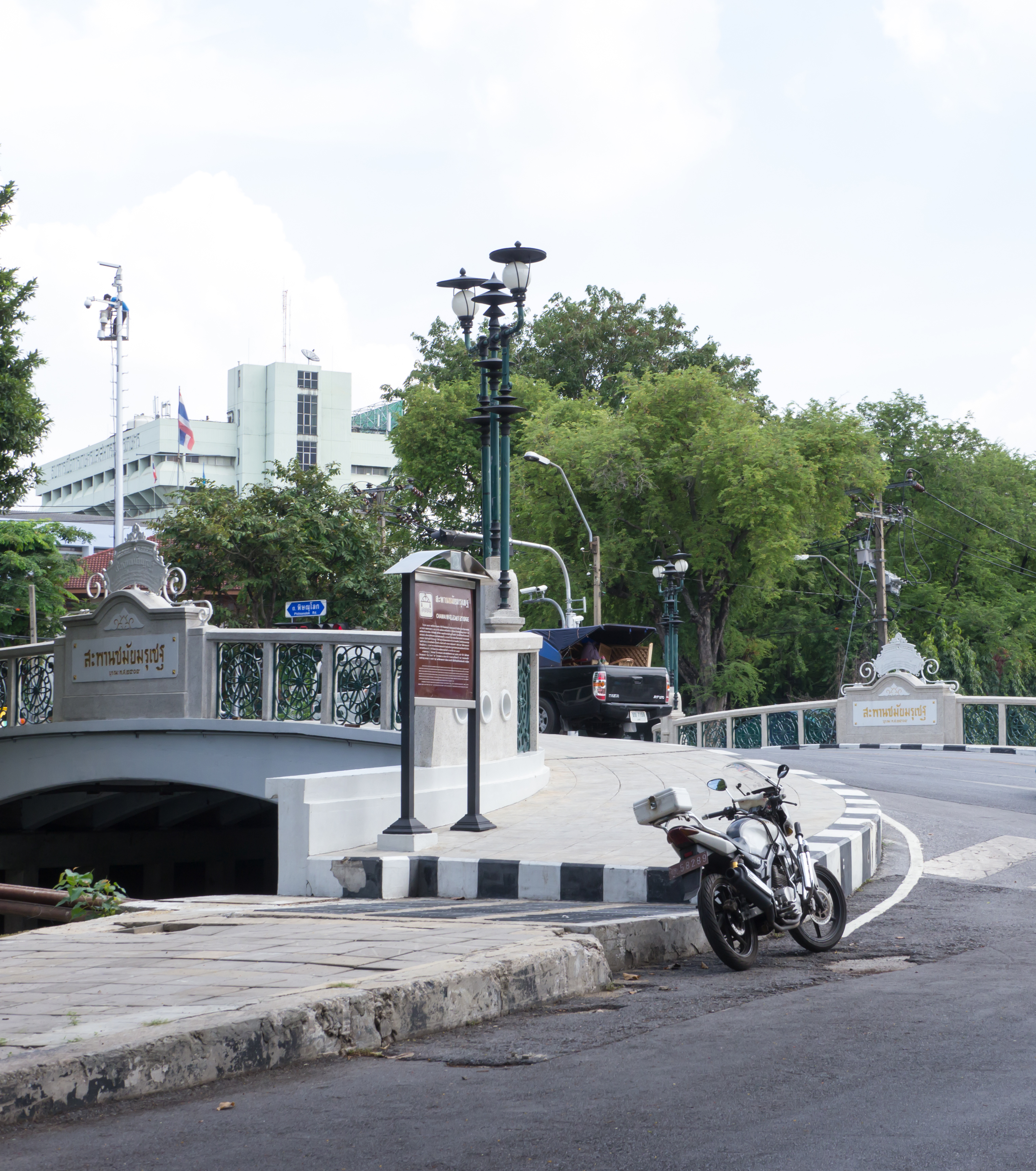
Chamai Maruchet Bridge, crossing Khlong Prem Prachakon in front of Government House

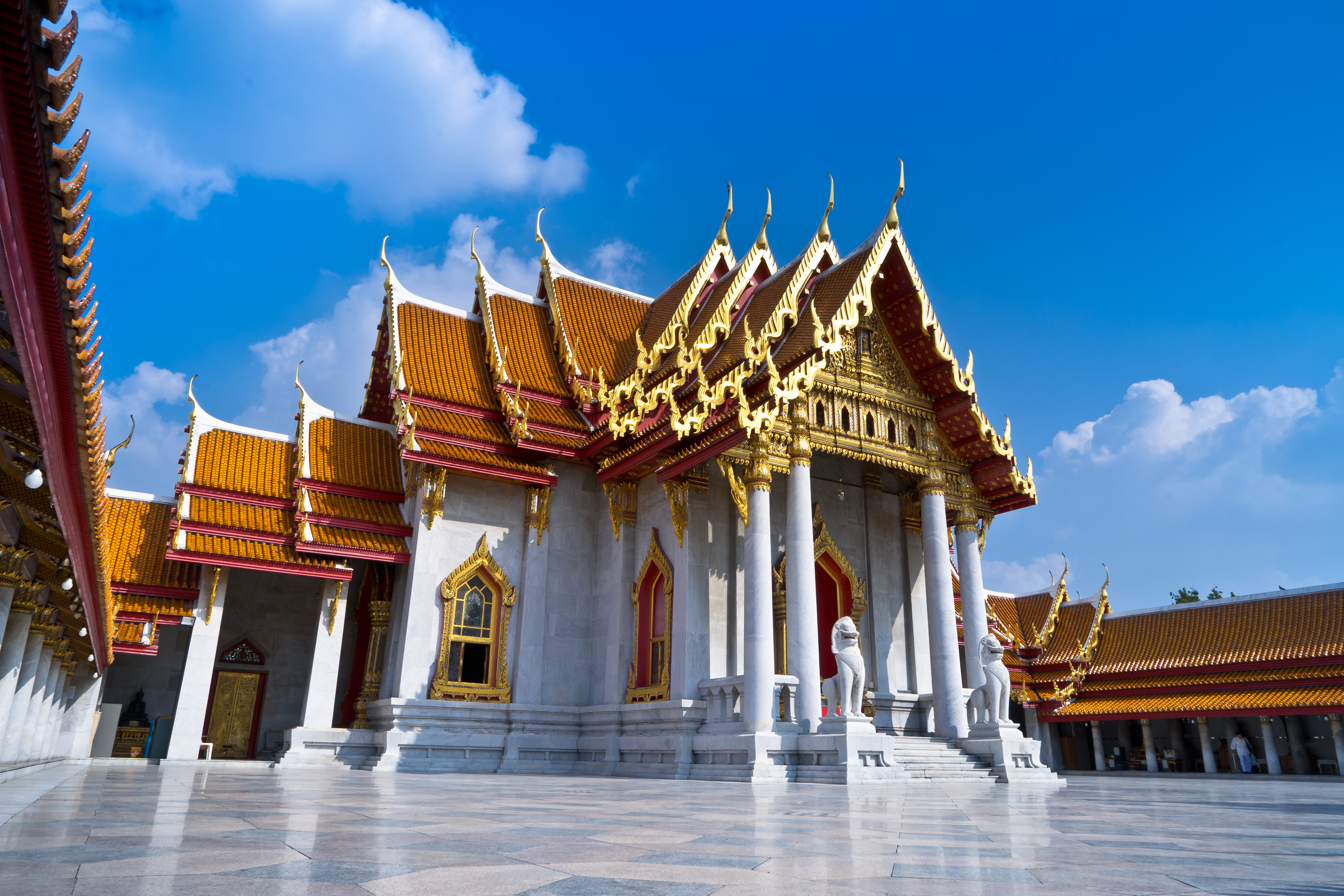
Wat Benchamabophit or Marble Temple

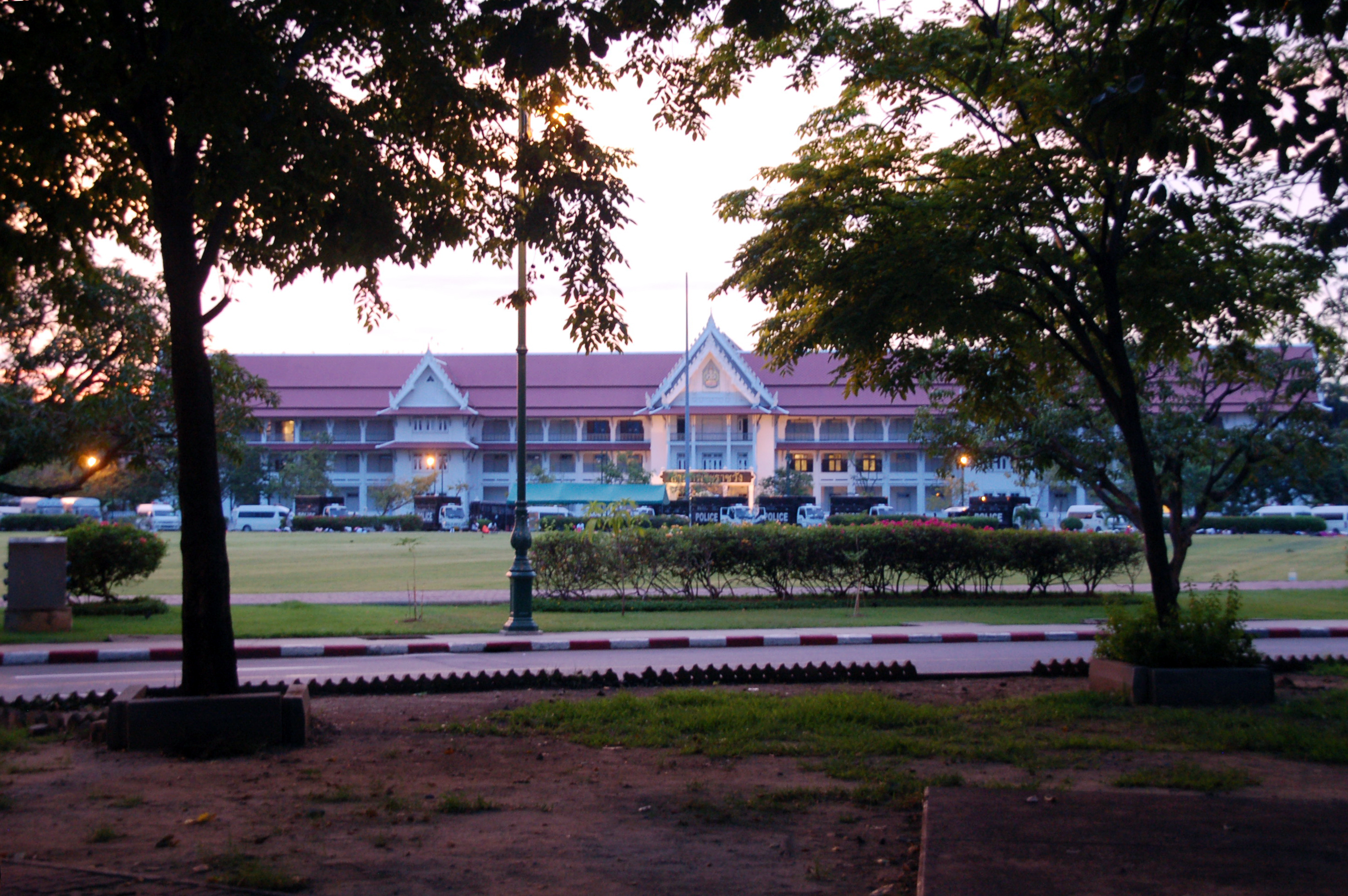
Sanam Sua Pa, beside Royal Plaza, Bureau of the Royal Household office

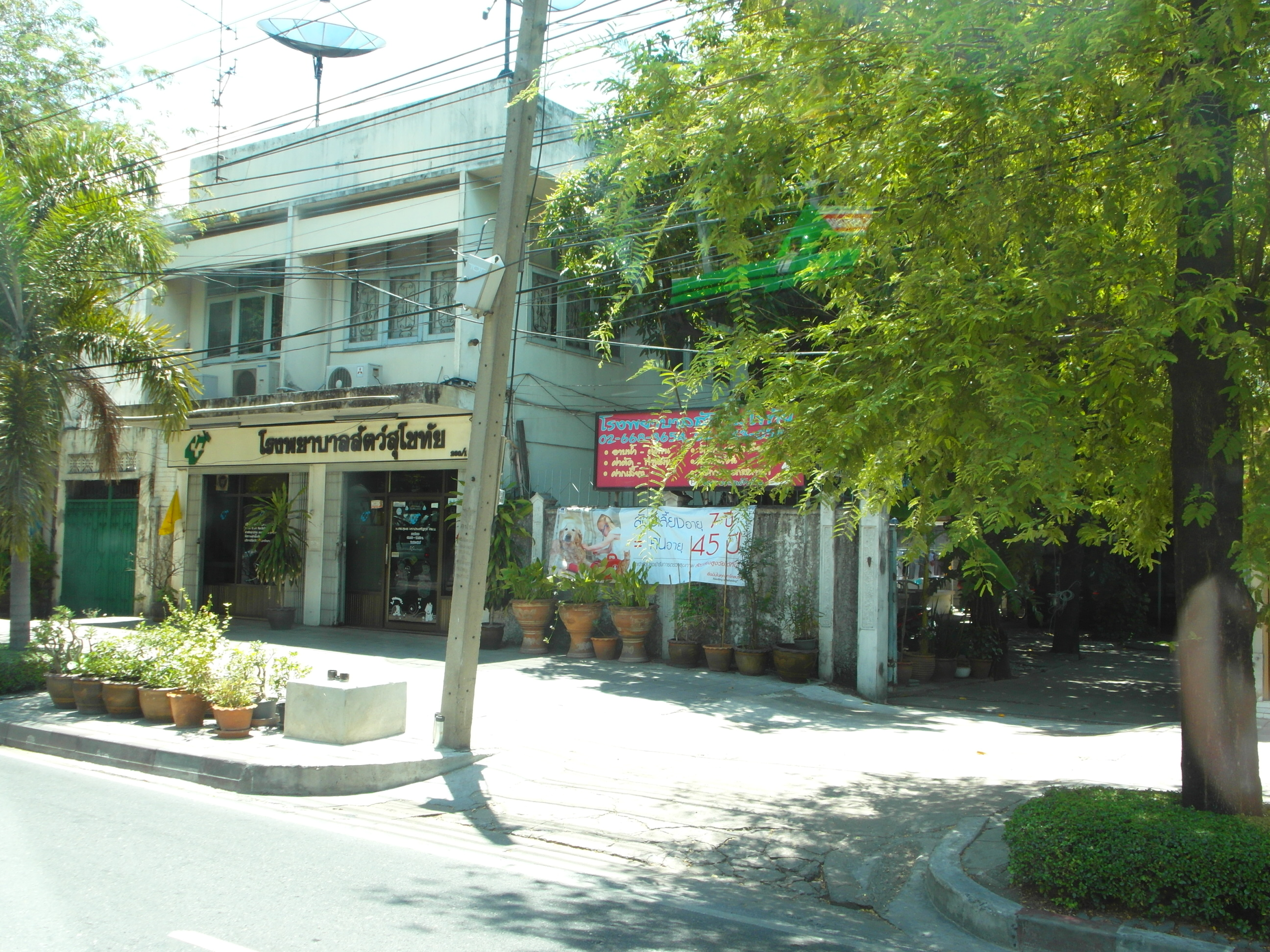
Veterinary hospital on Rama V Road opposite Chitralada Royal Villa

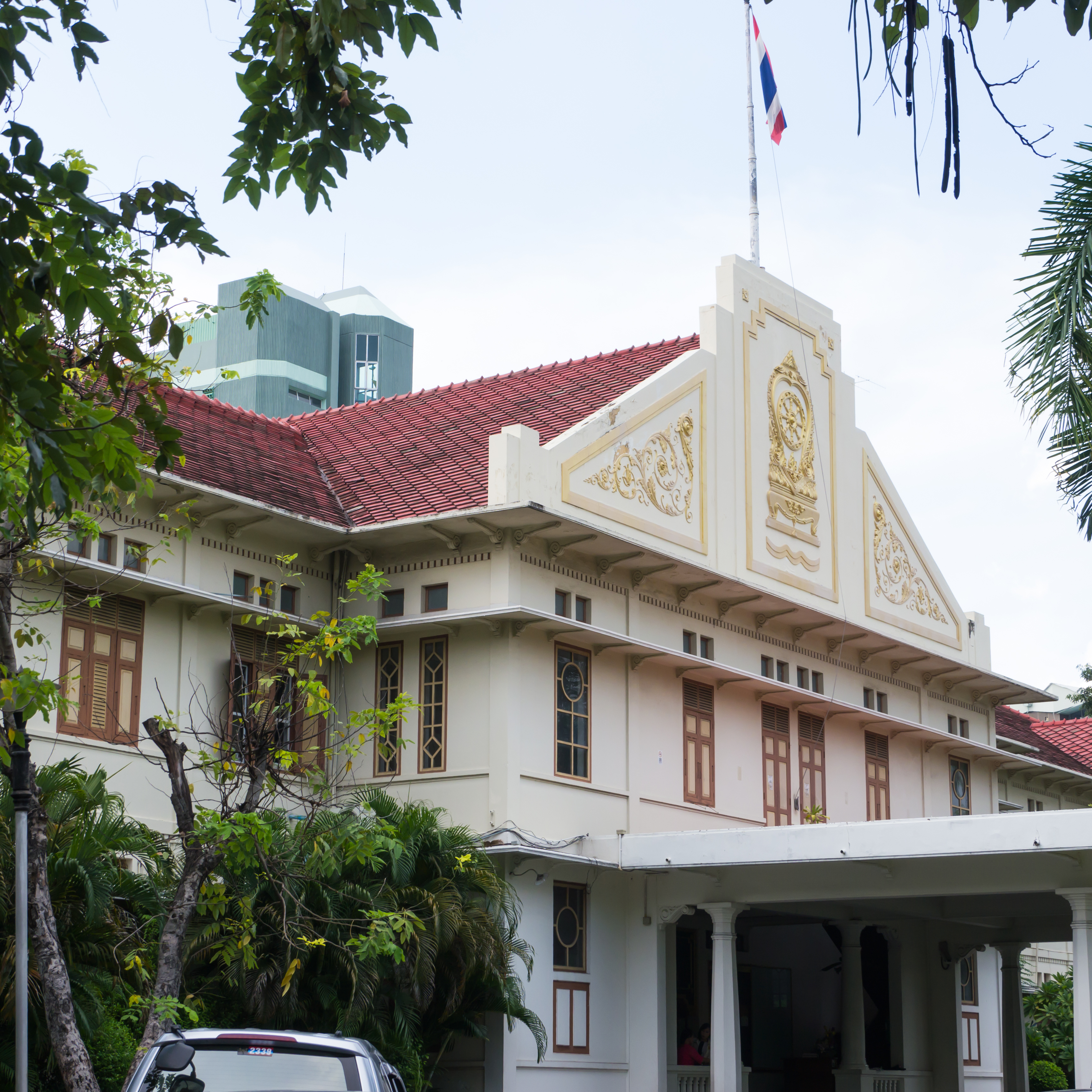
Ministry of Education

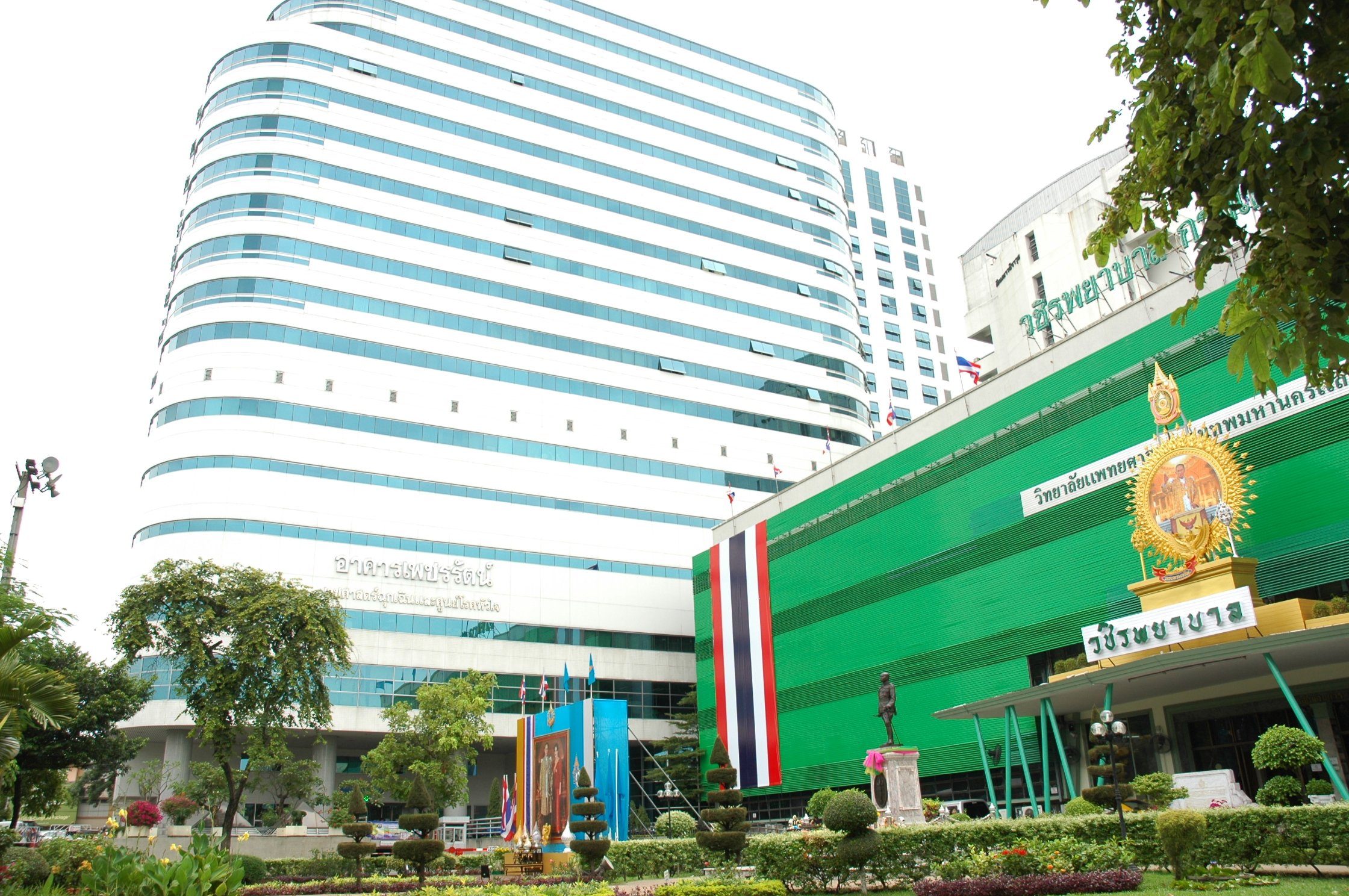
Vajira Hospital, public hospital

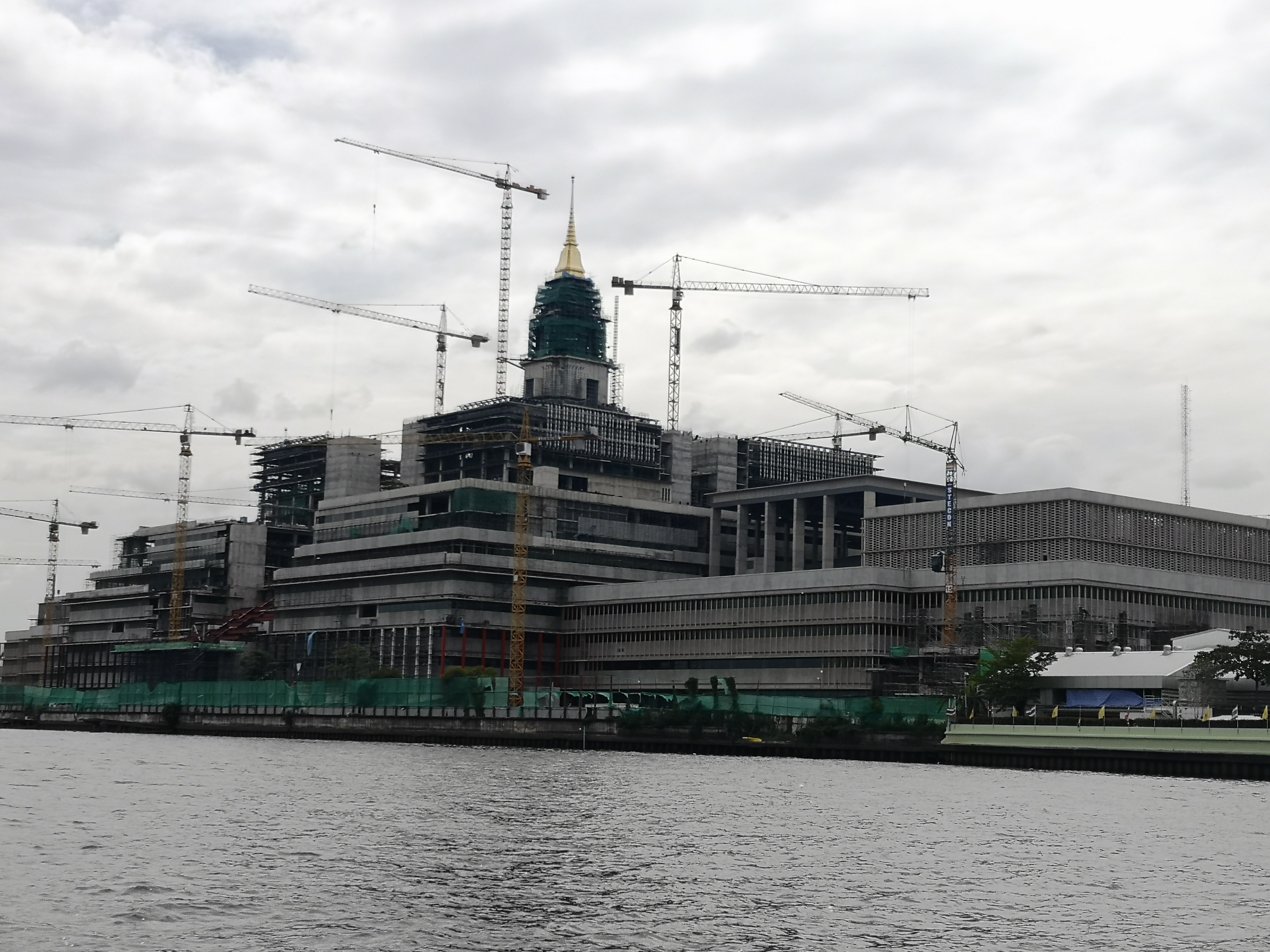
Sappaya-Sapasathan the new national legislative building

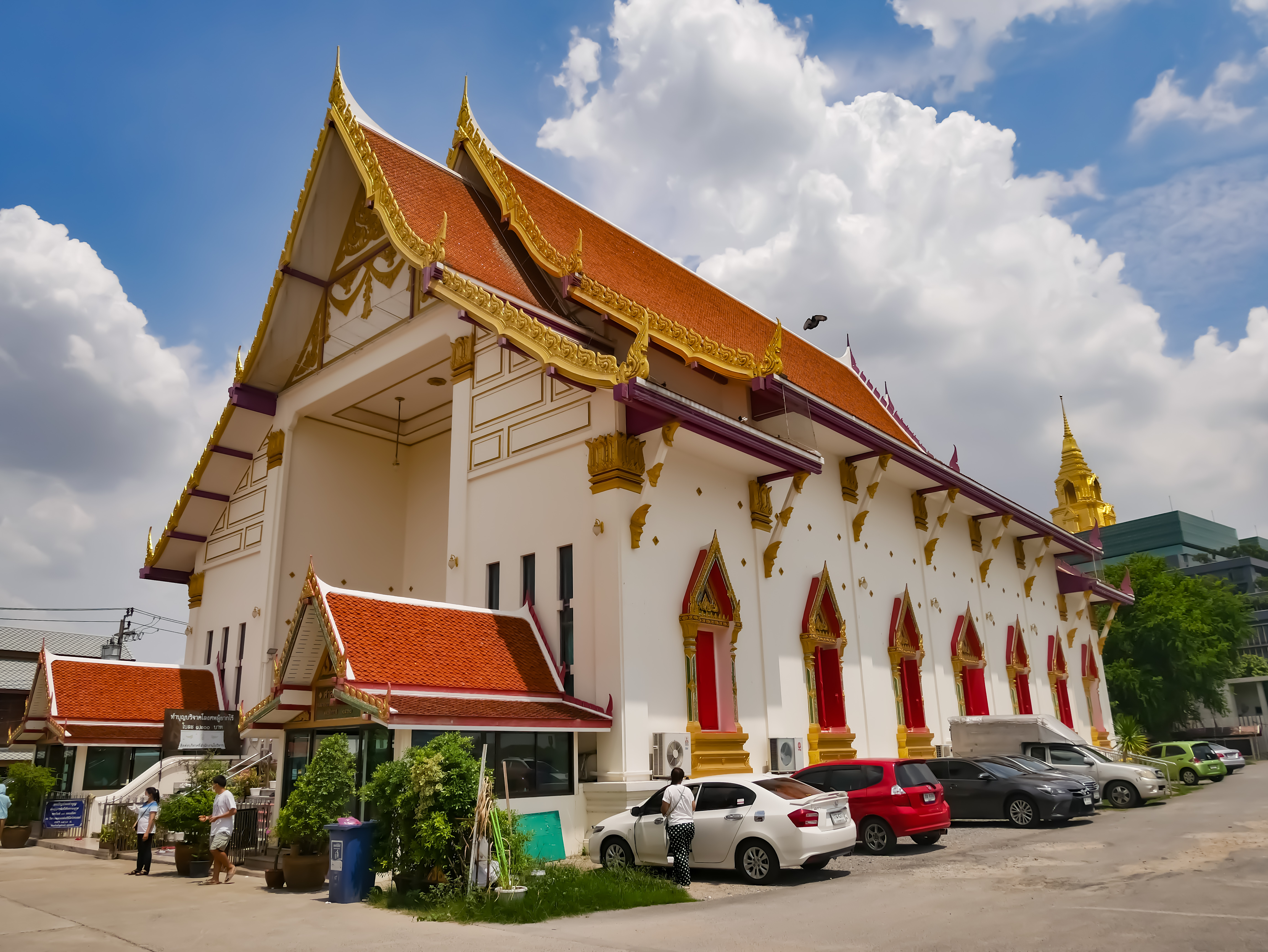
Wat Kaew Fah Chulamanee the temple by the Chao Phraya River

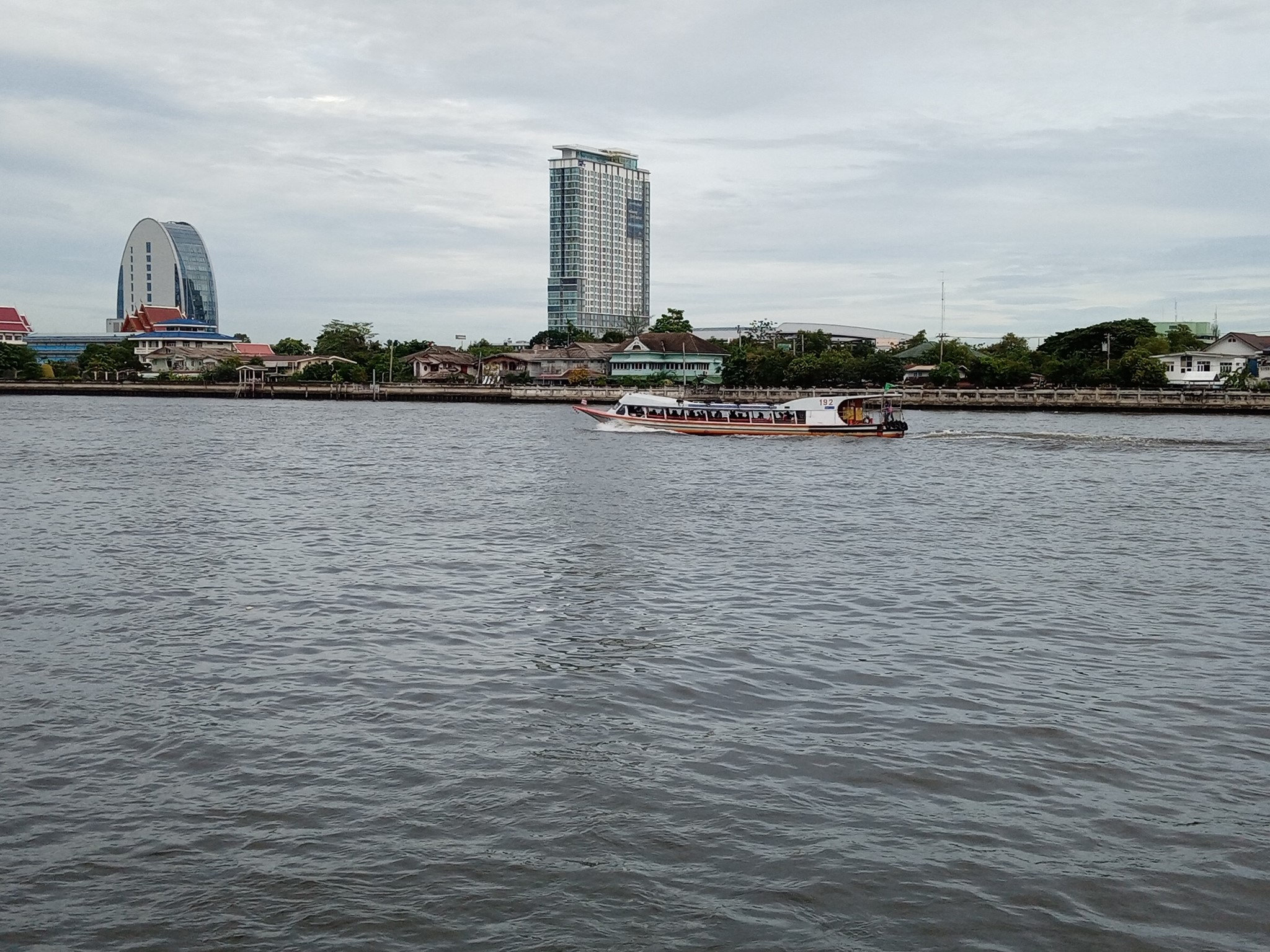
Chao Phraya Express Boat passes through Kheaw Khai Ka Pier, a pier between Irrigation Dept. and Kiak Kai Piers
