= Chitralada Royal Villa =

Royal villa within Dusit Palace in Bangkok, Thailand

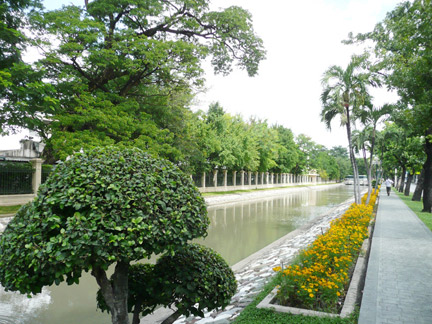
Chitralada Royal Villa in 2012

Chitralada Royal Villa (Thai: พระตำหนักจิตรลดารโหฐาน; RTGS: Chit Lada Raho-than) is a royal villa located within Dusit Palace. This villa was permanent-residence of King Bhumibol Adulyadej (Rama IX), the longest-serving monarch of Thailand and Queen Sirikit. He moved there after the death of his older brother, King Rama VIII in the Grand Palace. The palace grounds, which are surrounded by a moat and guarded by the royal guards, also contain the Chitralada School, initially established for the children of the royal family and palace staff. Chitralada Royal Villa has a Chitralada railway station which served for the royal family who lived in the villa. Prince Dipangkorn Rasmijoti was a pupil in the Chitralada School, the school is considered the most exclusive in Thailand.

Queen Mother Sirikit resided in the palace until her death in October 2025.

== History ==
The main building of the palace is a two-storey building, built in the reign of Rama VI. The palace was the residence of Rama VI. Chitralada School, was founded in 1958.

A dairy farm and factories were built as the King Bhumibol Adulyadej was interested in agriculture and agricultural industries. Research centers on agricultural products were also founded to provide training for farmers. "Chitralada" is used as the brandname for many products from the palace.

Visitors need to obtain a pass to enter.
