= Phaya Thai Subdistrict =

Phaya Thai พญาไท
- Khwaeng
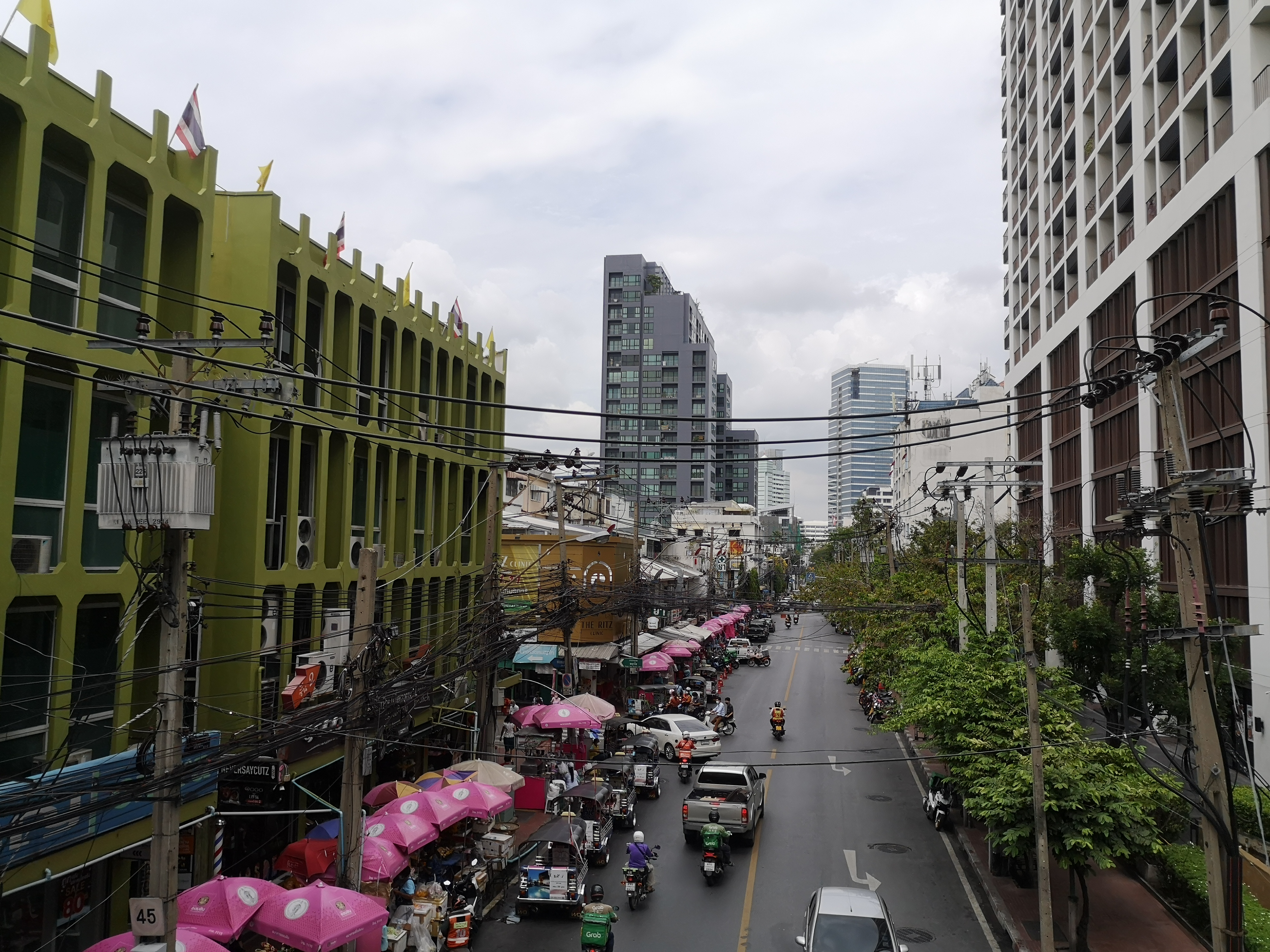
- Aree Street, located in Phaya Thai Subdistrict.

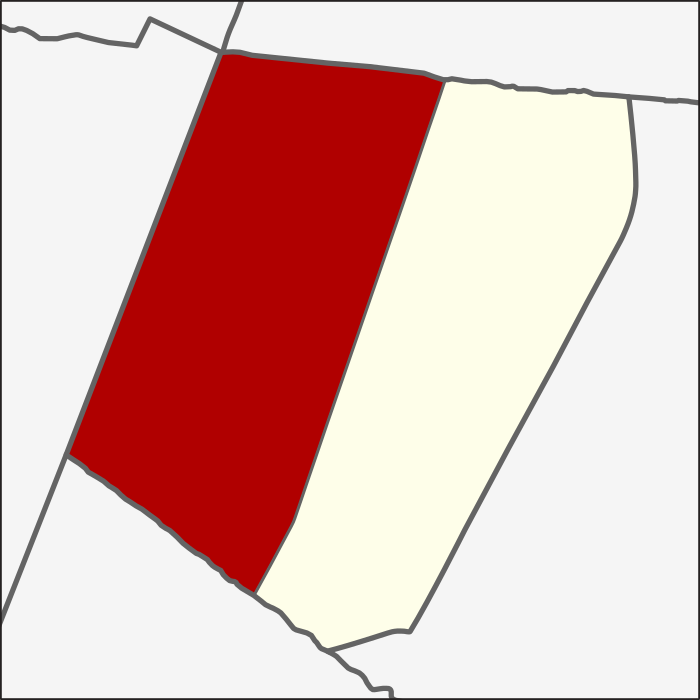
- Location in Phaya Thai District
- Country: Thailand
- Province: Bangkok
- Khet: Phaya Thai

Area
  - Total: 4.672 km^{2} (1.804 sq mi)

Population (2023)
  - Total: 34,558
- Time zone: UTC+7 (ICT)

Phaya Thai (Thai: พญาไท, pronounced [pʰā.jāː tʰāj]) is a khwaeng (subdistrict) in Phaya Thai District, Bangkok. In 2023, it had a population of 34,558.
