= Manas Jamveha =

- มนัส แจ่มเวหา
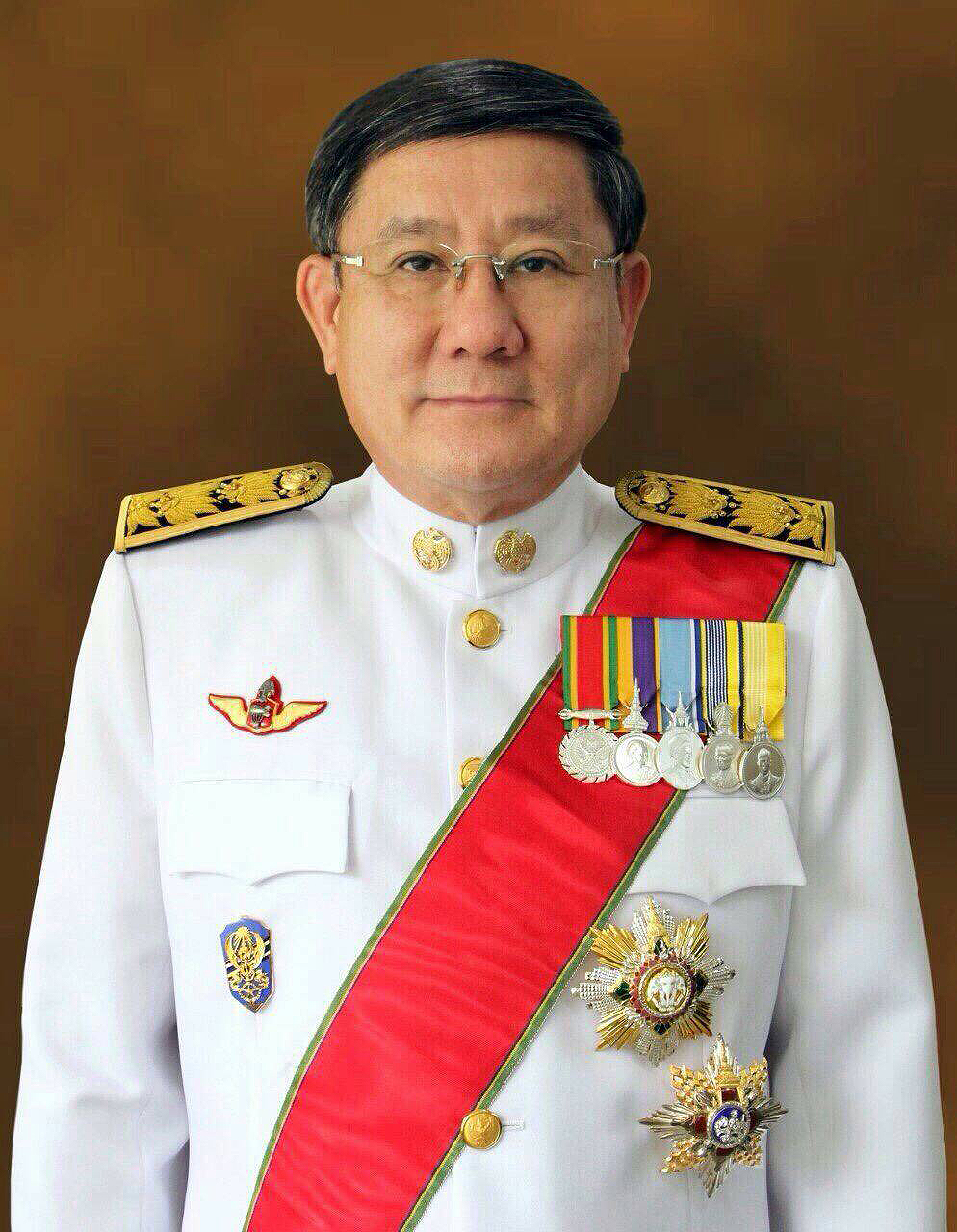
- Born: June 28, 1956; Thailand

Manas Jamveha (Thai: มนัส แจ่มเวหา) is Director General of The Comptroller General’s Department Thailand.

== Education ==
Manas earned bachelor's degree in law, and a master's degree in political science from Thammasat University. He earned a master's degree in business administration from Sukhothai Thammathirat Open University.

== Work ==
Manas has been director of the Fiscal Law and Regulation Standard Bureau, and Deputy Director General and Advisor on Fiscal System Development of The Comptroller General’s Department Thailand. From October 1, 2010, to September 30, 2011, he was Inspector General of The Ministry of Finance, and from October 1, 2011, to September 30, 2012, he was Deputy Permanent Secretary of Ministry of Finance. He has been Director General of The Comptroller General’s Department Thailand since October 1, 2012.

== Royal Decorations ==
Manas has received the following royal decorations in the Honours System of Thailand:

- 2014 Knight Grand Cross (Special Class) of The Most Exalted Order of The White Elephant.
- 2009 Knight Grand Cordon (Special Class) of The Most Noble Order of The Crown of Thailand.
- 2006 Knight Grand Cross (First Class) of The Most Exalted Order of The White Elephant.
- 2003 Knight Grand Cross (First Class) of The Most Noble Order of The Crown of Thailand.
