= MuvMi =

Thai ridesharing company

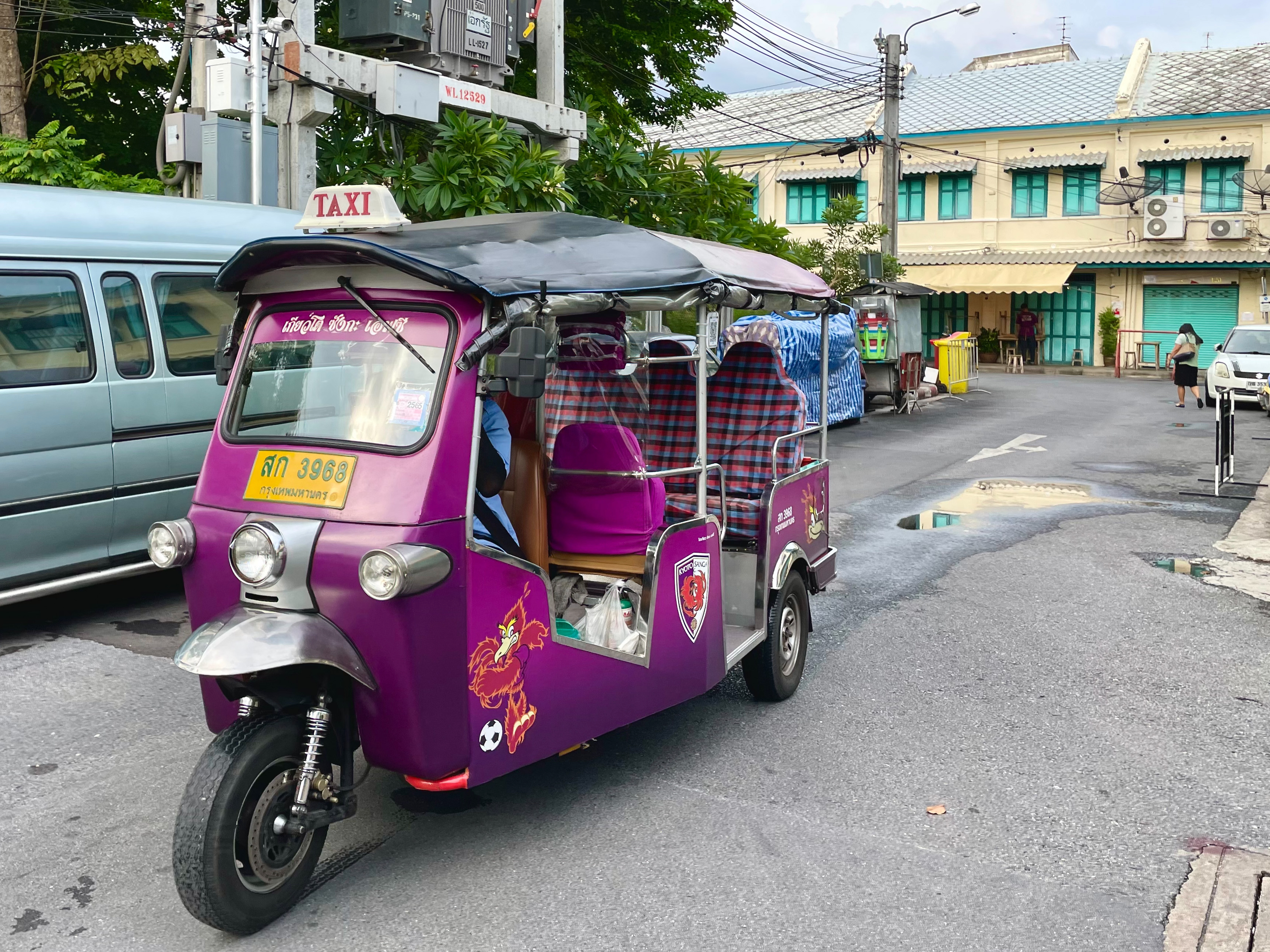
- A MuvMi EV tuk-tuk on a street in Bangkok, Thailand
- Native name: มูฟมี
- Company type: Private
- Industry: Technology; Transportation; Micromobility
- Founded: 2016
- Headquarters: Phaya Thai, Bangkok, Thailand
- Area served: Bangkok
- Key people: Krisada Kritayakirana (CEO)
- Products: Mobile app
- Parent: Urban Mobility Tech Co. Ltd.
- Website: www.muvmi.co

MuvMi (Thai: มูฟมี; RTGS: mufmi) is a Thai ride sharing startup based in Bangkok, Thailand. It is the developer of the MuvMi app, offering rides via electric tuk-tuks. The app is designed to provide first- and last-mile connections with Bangkok's transit network.

MuvMi operates a fleet of over 600 electric tuk-tuks in 12 Bangkok neighborhoods as of 2024.

== History ==
Founded in 2016 by Krisada Kritayakirana, Pipat Tangsiripaisan and Supapong Kitiwattanasak, MuvMi was supported by Thailand's National Innovation Agency. MuvMi's expansion was delayed during the COVID-19 pandemic from 2020 to 2021, with the vehicles mostly used to carry goods. In 2023, MuvMi announced plans to expand from 350 vehicles to 1,000 by the end of the year, and 4,000 to 5,000 within five years.

The vehicles are manufactured by Thai Rung Union Car. The company's headquarters are in Ari, Phaya Thai district.

In February 2026, the Bangkok Metropolitan Administration began offering a taxi boat ride-hailing service via the MuvMi app in Phadung Krung Kasem canal.

== Locations served ==
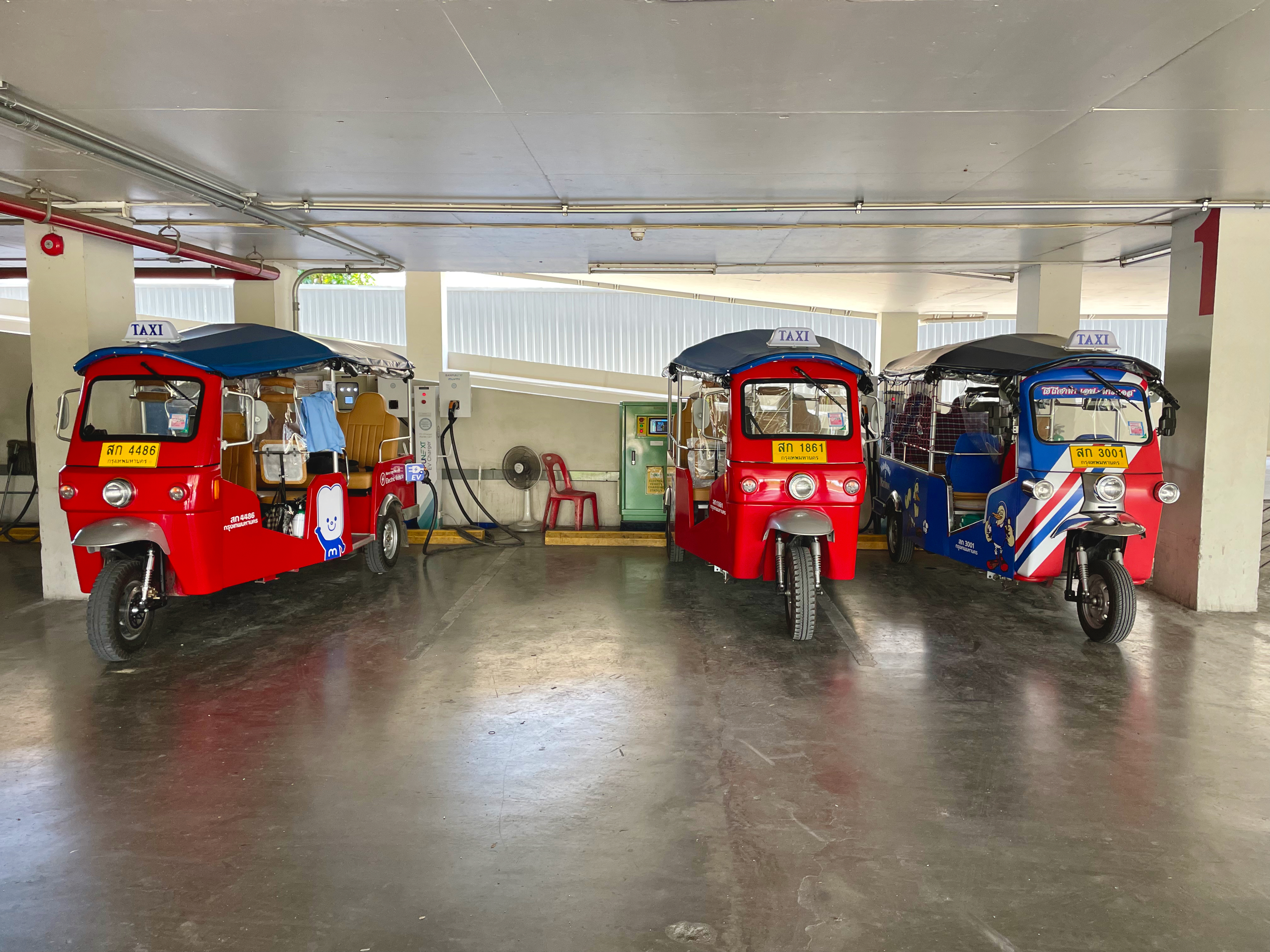
Charging infrastructure for electric MuvMi tuk-tuks at the company's headquarters in Phaya Thai, Bangkok

- Ari – Pradiphat
- Bang Sue
- Chula – Chit Lom
- On Nut
- Phahonyothin – Kaset
- Ratchada – Rama 9
- Rattanakosin
- Si Lom – Sathorn
- Sukhumvit
- Victory Monument
- Bearing – Lasalle
- Wongwian Yai
