= Climate change in Thailand =

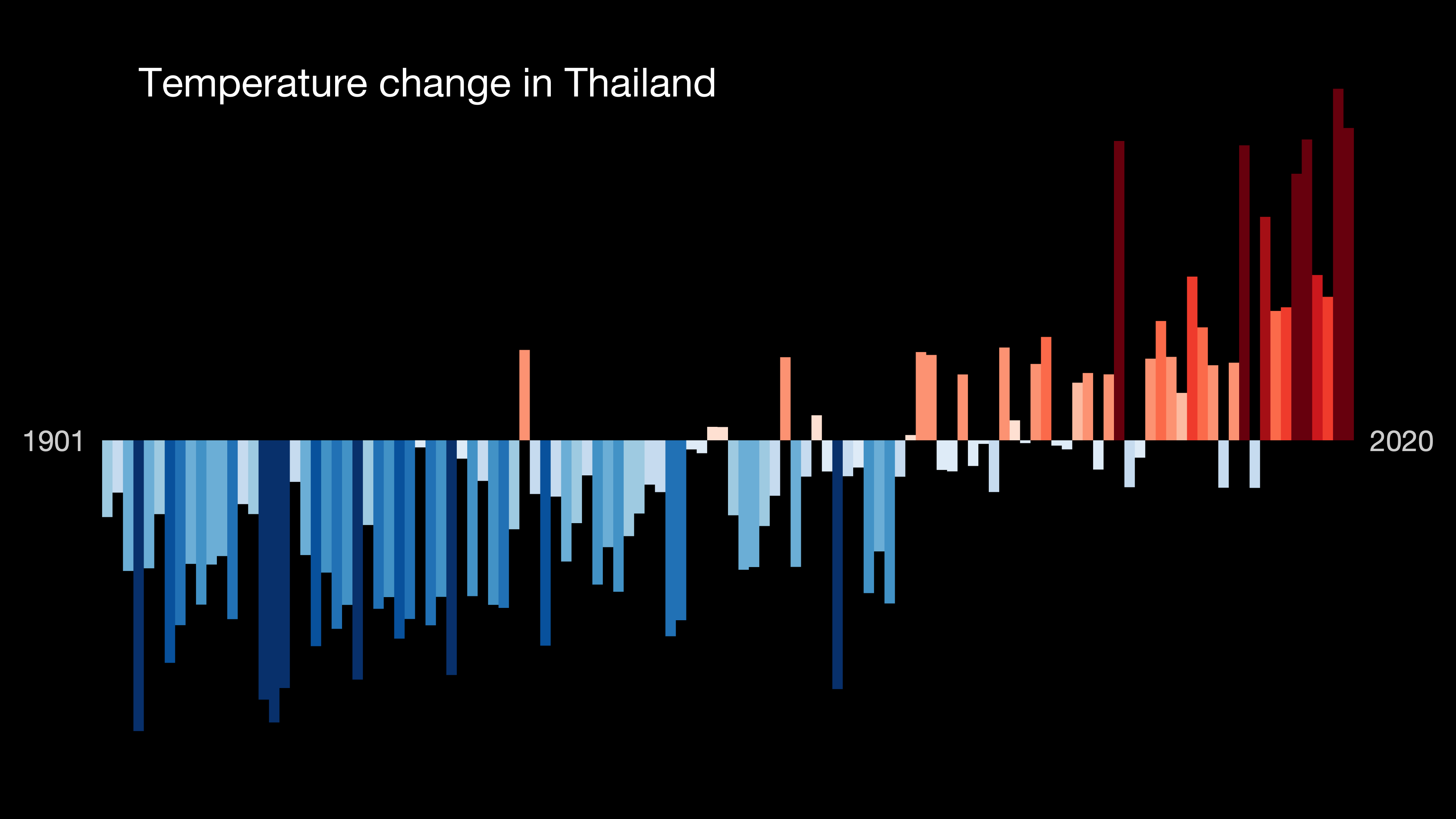
Graph showing temperature change in Thailand between 1901 and 2021

Since the 20th century, climate change has caused temperatures in Thailand to increase. Thailand is considered highly vulnerable to the effects of climate change. Extreme heat and rising sea levels threaten parts of Thailand, including the capital city of Bangkok. Erosion is considered a major problem due to climate change within the country.

As a signatory to the 2015 Paris Agreement, the Thai government has committed a nationally determined contribution to reduce its annual greenhouse gas emissions by 20–25% by 2030.

== Temperature change ==
Köppen climate classification map for Thailand for 1980–2016

2071–2100 map under the most intense climate change scenario. Mid-range scenarios are currently considered more likely

Researchers have found that temperatures have increased in Thailand over the past half-century, though there is some variability in their assessments. Thailand's Department of Meteorology reported that the annual mean temperature in Thailand rose by one degree Celsius from 1981 to 2007. Another study found that average annual temperatures in Thailand increased by 0.95 °C between 1955 and 2009, more than the average world temperature increase of 0.69 °C. The annual highest temperature has increased by 0.86 °C and the annual lowest temperature has decreased by 1.45 °C over the past 55 years.

From 1993 to 2008, the sea level in the Gulf of Thailand has risen 3–5 mm per year, compared to the global average of 1.7 mm per year. Danny Marks, professor and climate consultant for the Rockefeller Foundation, has warned that "Climate change is set to drastically affect the world, and Thailand will likely be one of the most affected countries given its geography, economy, and level of development."

In 2024, Thailand was hit by a severe heat wave, leading to record-breaking temperatures across the nation. In April, over three dozen districts reported unprecedented highs, breaking records some of which date back to 1958. The highest temperature this year was recorded in Lampang at 44.2 °C, nearing the national record of 44.6 °C. The heat has also driven power consumption to a record peak of 36,477.8 megawatts.in 30 April 2024 20:56, The Ministry of Public Health has reported approximately 30 heat-related fatalities nationwide due to the extreme temperatures.

== Rising sea level ==
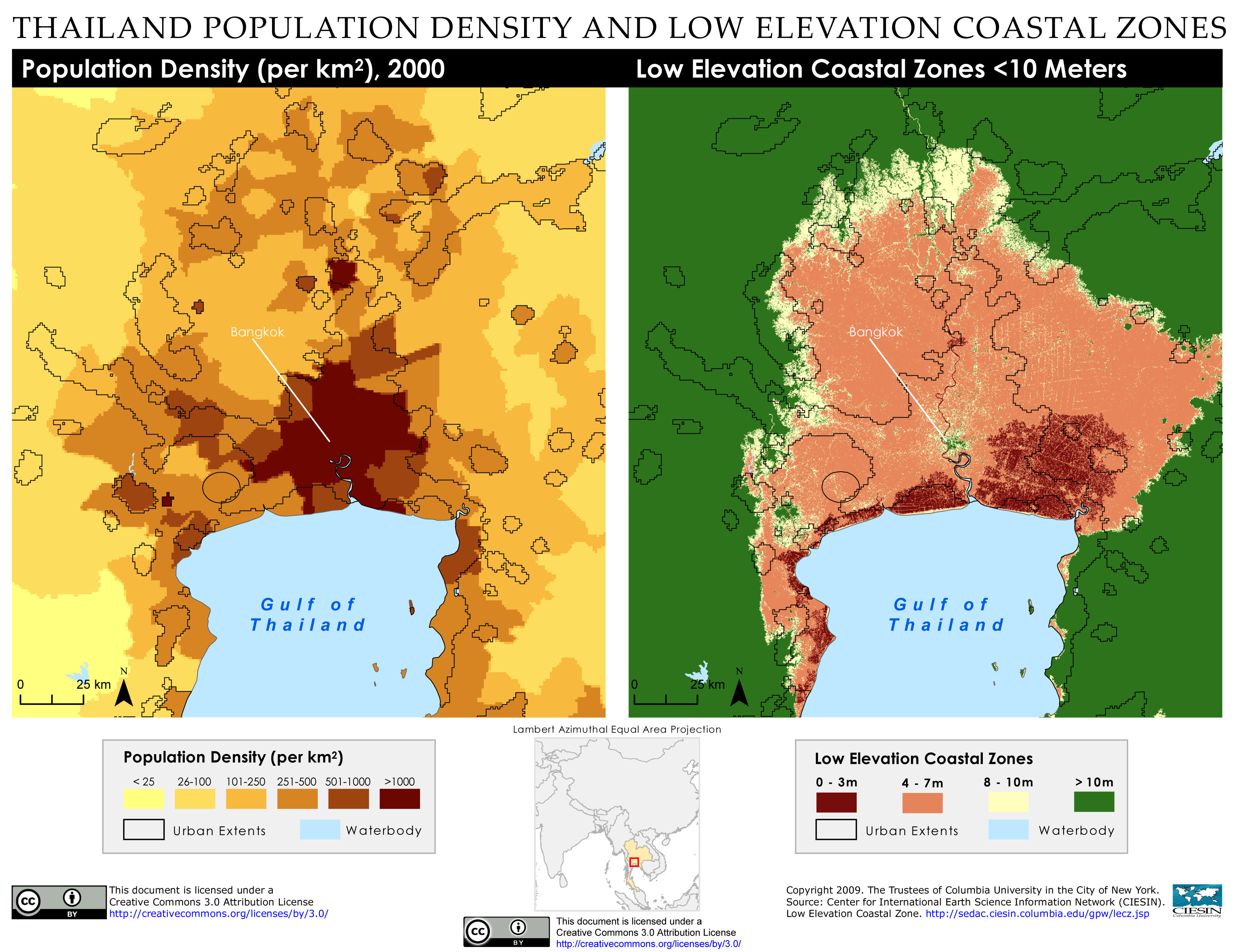
Bangkok and surrounding areas have a high population density in a low-elevation coastal zone, meaning the city is at risk from sea level rise.

Rising sea levels, caused by climate change, is one of the major threats that climate change poses to Thailand.

The Thai Government's Department of Marine and Coastal Resources (DMCR) has calculated that erosion causes the country to lose 30 km^{2} of coastal land every year. The Thai Office of Natural Resources and Environmental Policy and Planning predicts that the sea level will rise one meter in the next 40 to 100 years, impacting at least 3,200 km^{2} of coastal land, at a potential cost to Thailand of three billion baht. 17% of Thailand's population, more than 11 million people, will be directly affected by this.

The ground under Bangkok sinks around three centimeters per year. Subsidence, partially caused by the city's location on an alluvial plain of soft clay, has been exacerbated by industries' excessive pumping of groundwater and by the weight of massive buildings. According to Thailand's National Reform Council (NRC), without urgent action, Bangkok could be under water by 2030 due to a combination of rising sea levels, groundwater extraction, and the weight of city buildings. Critics argue that despite warnings from experts that coastal Thailand and Bangkok face catastrophic and perpetual flooding similar to the 2011 Thai floods, the government is still moving too slowly to address the impacts of climate change.

== Government action ==
Thailand submitted its Intended Nationally Determined Contribution (INDC) to the United Nations Framework Convention on Climate Change (UNFCCC) on 1 October 2015. It pledged a 20–25% reduction in its emissions of greenhouse gases by 2030. Thailand sent 81 representatives, at a cost of 20 million baht, to the 2015 United Nations Climate Change Conference (COP 21 or CMP 11) in Paris. Thailand signed the Paris Climate Agreement on 22 April 2016 at the official signing ceremony, and ratified its adherence to the treaty on 21 September 2016.

National pledges in Paris equate to a 3 °C increase in global temperatures according to climate scientists. Negotiators in Paris worked to bring this down to 2 °C, but even this lower number may be "catastrophic for Bangkok," forcing the abandonment of the city by 2200 at the latest and by 2045–2070 at the earliest. In a paper published on 1 March 2016, climate researchers James Hansen and Makiko Sato state that, "The tropics...in summer are in danger of becoming practically uninhabitable by the end of the century if business-as-usual fossil fuel emissions continue..." In 2015, Bangkok averaged 29.6 °C, 1.6 °C higher than normal.

In November 2019, the Fundación Ecológica Universal (FEU), a global environmental NGO based in Buenos Aires, published an assessment of national climate pledges. It judged Thailand's nationally determined contribution to be "insufficient." At the Paris Agreement, Thailand pledged to reduce carbon emissions by 20% below its projected "business as usual" (BAU) emissions, using 2005 emissions as a baseline, by 2030, plus an additional 5% decrease contingent on receiving help from developed nations. In contrast, FEU calculated that Thailand's 20% reduction in GHG emissions by 2030 would amount to an increase in emissions of 39% more than 2013's emissions. The FEU assessment judged every ASEAN nation's pledges to be insufficient: Myanmar has set no emissions reduction target; Cambodia and Laos would not commit to any reductions unless international assistance is forthcoming; and Brunei and the Philippines had yet, as of 2019, to declare INDCs. The FEU report stood in sharp contrast to the narrative expressed by Thai premier and ASEAN Chair Prayut Chan-o-cha at the 2019 UN Climate Action Summit in September 2019, where he claimed that the region had reduced its use of energy by 22% compared to 2005. A study shows that the efforts to curb emissions by Thailand and other ASEAN countries are still incompatible with their nationally determined contributions under the Paris Agreement.

== Vulnerability and governmental response ==
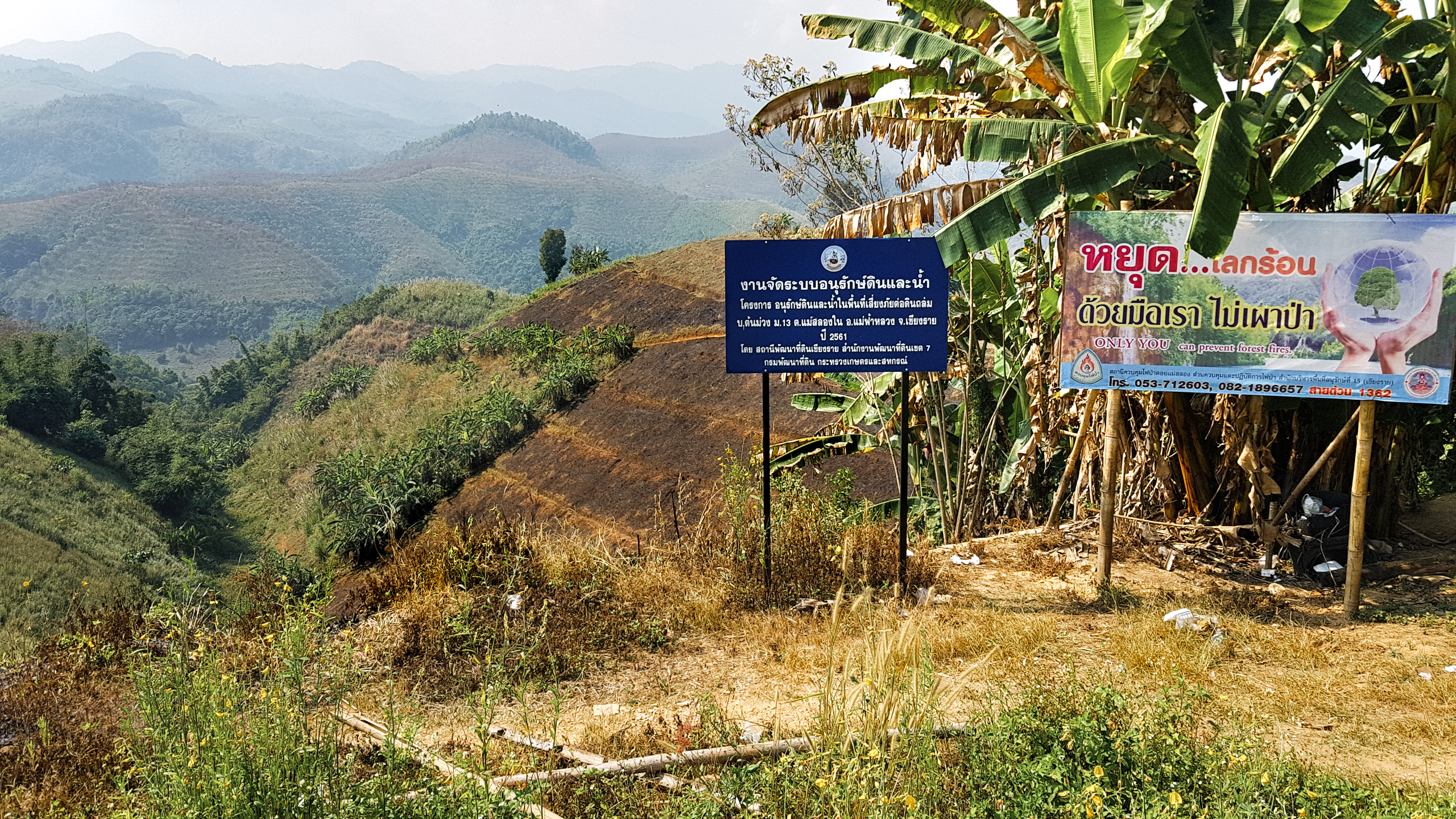
Wildfire warning signs in front of a recently burnt field

Some tropical ecosystems are being decimated by climate change far faster than expected—coral bleaching is one example—while many more habitats may be damaged over time. Tropical ecosystems are considered particularly vulnerable because many tropical species have evolved within very specific temperature ranges. As temperatures rise, they may not survive. According to one report, Thailand will likely be disproportionately affected by the consequences of climate change.

Extreme heat in Southeast Asia today reduces working hours by 15–20%, and that figure could double by 2050 as climate change progresses, according to a paper published in the Asia-Pacific Journal of Public Health. The paper projects a loss of six percent of Thailand's GDP by 2030 due to a diminution of working hours caused by rising temperature. A 2013 paper published in Nature, by Mora, et al. forecasts that things in the tropics will start going "haywire" around the year 2020. Some scientists project that by 2100, "...most of the low and mid latitudes will be uninhabitable because of heat stress or drought..." A study published in the Proceedings of the National Academy of Sciences examined how worst-case CO_{2} emissions would affect the human habitat: by the end of the century, the average human will experience a temperature increase of 7.5 °C when global temperatures increase 3 °C the study predicts. At that level, about 30% of the world's population would live in extreme heat, defined as an average temperature of 29 °C. In 2020, this temperature is rare outside the hottest parts of the Sahara Desert. Thailand is among those geographies affected, with a projected 62 million Thais exposed to extreme heat.

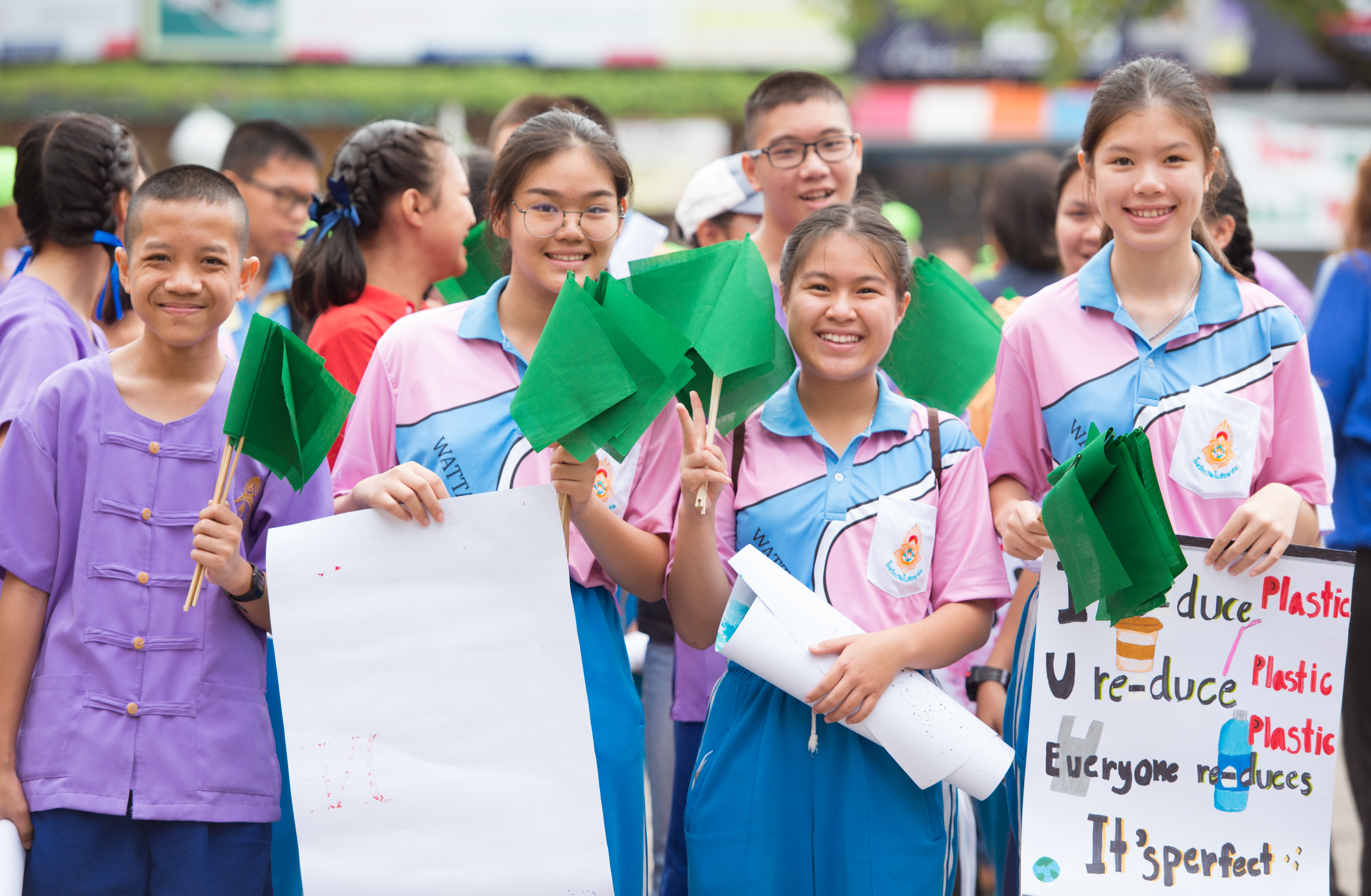
Thai youths at the September 2019 climate strikes in Chiang Mai

NASA reported that 2016 would be the hottest year ever recorded in 136 years of modern record keeping. Locally, the Thai Meteorological Department reported that the temperature in Mae Hong Son Province reached 44.6 °C on 28 April 2016, breaking Thailand's "hottest day" record. April in Thailand is typically hot, but 2016's weather set a record for the longest heat wave in at least 65 years. In its WMO Statement on the State of the Global Climate in 2016, the World Meteorological Organization confirmed that 2016 was the hottest year in Thailand's history.

The Climate Impact Group at NASA's Goddard Institute for Space Studies analyzed climate data for major cities worldwide. It found that Bangkok in 1960 had 193 days at or above 32 °C. In 2018, Bangkok can expect 276 days at or above 32 °C. The group forecasts a rise by 2100 to, on average, 297 to 344 days at or above 32 °C. The FAO's The State of the World's Fisheries and Aquaculture 2016 reports that a recent study finds that climate change will affect food security in Asia by the middle of the 21st century. It counts Thailand's fisheries as among the most negatively impacted considering all environments—freshwater, brackish-water, and marine fisheries.

Researchers at Stanford University and the University of California, studying historical records of how temperature affects economies, predict that, given current trends, global income will be 23% less by the end of the century than it would be without climate change. The decline in income is not evenly distributed, with tropical regions hardest hit. The study estimates that Thailand's GDP will have declined by 90% in 2099 relative to GDP in 2016. Even niche sectors of the economy could be affected: coral reef tourism worldwide—worth US$36 billion in 2019—may decline by 90% in Thailand and the other four leading reef tourism destinations by 2100.

Thailand's CO_{2} emissions per capita rose from 0.14 tonnes in 1960 to 4.5 tonnes in 2013, while the population rose from 27 million to 67 million over the same period. The Thai government's Climate Change Master Plan, 2012-2050 foresees that "Thailand is able to continue its economic, social, and environmental developments in accordance with sufficiency economy philosophy and to cut greenhouse gas emissions by 2050, without impeding the country's gross domestic product (GDP) or reducing its growth of developmental capability and competitiveness." The Bangkok250 and Green Bangkok 2030 projects aim to make the capital more walkable, reduce emissions, and improve air quality.

As of 2025, the Climate Change Bill is expected to be passed by Parliament, which will implement emissions monitoring and reduction.

== See also ==
- Plug-in electric vehicles in Thailand
