= Krisada Kritayakirana =

Thai businessman and engineer

- กฤษดา กฤตยากีรณ
- Other name: Mick

Academic background
- Education: Chulalongkorn University (BA; University of Cambridge (MPhil); Stanford University (PhD)
- Thesis: Autonomous Vehicle Control at the Limits of Handling (2012)
- Doctoral advisor: J. Christian Gerdes

Krisada Kritayakirana (Thai: กฤษดา กฤตยากีรณ, RTGS: Kritsada Krittayakirana) is a Thai businessman and engineer, specializing in automotive technology. Kritayakirana is the co-founder and CEO of Urban Mobility Tech Co. Ltd, a Thai company offering electric tuk tuk ride sharing through the MuvMi app.

Krisada attended the Triam Udom Suksa Pattanakarn School in Bangkok for secondary school. He later attended Chulalongkorn University, graduating in 2001 with a bachelor of engineering in automotive engineering, the University of Cambridge, graduating in 2002 with a master of philosophy in mechanical engineering. He later attended Stanford University as a Fulbright Science and Technology Fellow, graduating in 2012 with a doctor of philosophy in mechanical engineering.

== Publications ==
- Autonomous Cornering at the Limits: Maximizing a “g-g” Diagram by Using Feedforward Trail-Braking and Throttle-on-Exit (2010)
- Pushing the limits: From lanekeeping to autonomous racing (2011)
- Autonomous Vehicle Control at the Limits of Handling (2012)
- Using the centre of percussion to design a steering controller for an autonomous race car (2012)
