= Plug-in electric vehicles in Thailand =

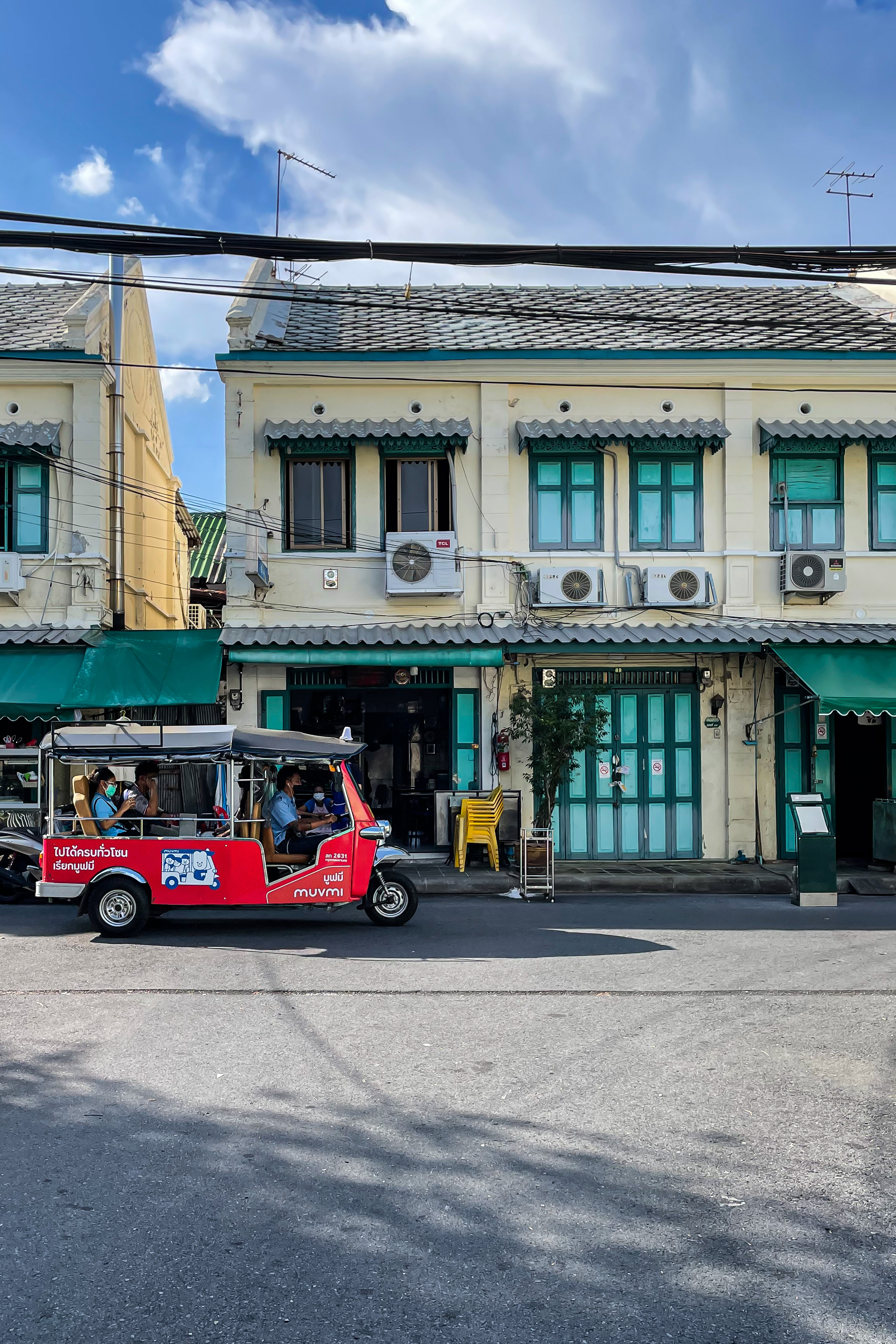
A MuvMi electric tuk-tuk in Phraeng Phuthon, Bangkok

The manufacture, sale, and adoption of electric vehicles in Thailand is supported by the Thai government, in order to reduce carbon emissions and air pollution. Prime Minister Prayut Chan-o-cha appointed the National Electric Vehicle Policy Committee in February 2020 to set targets for zero emission vehicle adoption. The government has announced aims for 30% of automobiles produced in 2030 to be electric (30:30 policy), and to become a regional hub for electric vehicle manufacturing.

As of 31 December 2021, there were 11,382 battery-powered electric vehicles (including cars, motorcycles, trucks, buses, and tuk-tuks) registered in Thailand, along with 31,145 plug-in hybrid electric vehicles and 196,582 hybrid electric vehicles. The EV market in Thailand picked up rapidly in 2023, with 44,045 new registrations in the first half of the year alone (not including motorcycles).

== Domestic manufacturing and sales ==
Thailand is a large regional producer of automobiles. Hybrid electric vehicles (HEVs) were first made available in 2009, the country has begun to build manufacturing capacity for electric vehicles such as passenger cars, trucks, buses, and tuk-tuks. In 2021, 5,781 battery-powered electric vehicles were registered in Thailand. These included 1,955 cars, 3,763 motorcycles, 32 tuk-tuks, 119 buses, and 2 trucks. 7,060 plug-in hybrid electric vehicles and 56,740 hybrid electric vehicles were registered in 2021.

FOMM was the first car manufacturer to produce battery-powered electric vehicles in Thailand in 2018.

In June 2021, Great Wall Motor, a Chinese automobile manufacturer, opened a factory in Rayong. The factory will make plug-in electric vehicles, in addition to hybrid, plug-in hybrid, and gas powered models. PTT and Foxconn signed a contract in September 2021 to produce electric vehicles in Thailand. In December 2021, Energy Absolute opened the largest electric vehicle battery factory by production (1 gigawatt-hour per year) in ASEAN, in Chachoengsao. The factory will supply some the company's buses with batteries.

Great Wall Motor, and PTT-Foxconn, and Energy Absolute's production facilities will be located in Thailand's Eastern Economic Corridor.

In April 2022, Rojana Industrial Park, a developer of industrial estates, signed a joint venture with US electric vehicle manufacture EVLOMO to begin producing electric vehicle batteries by the end of the year.

Tesla registered its Thailand office in May 2022, and plans to sell electric passenger cars, pick-up trucks, and other vehicles in Thailand.

Electric battery-powered tuk-tuks are being manufactured for usage in the transit, tourism, and real estate sectors.

The establishment of a localized supply chain is critical for Thailand's continued EV sector growth. Chinese battery manufacturer SVOLT Energy Technology, in partnership with Thai energy company Banpu Next, began producing EV battery packs in early 2024. Changan also announced significant partnerships with Thai-based parts manufacturers to support its EV production starting in 2025.

According to Eric Ruge, Managing Director of BMW Manufacturing (Thailand) Co. Ltd., the market's rapid development has been surprising even for industry experts. In 2023, EV sales in Thailand surged nearly eight-fold to 76,000 units, representing 12% of all vehicles sold. The market share increased to 14% in the first quarter of 2024, positioning the country as a leading EV market in Southeast Asia.

Accumulated Number of Electric Vehicle Registrations (2017-2021)
	Battery electric vehicles (BEV)	Plug-in hybrid electric vehicles (PHEV)	Hybrid electric vehicles (HEV)	HEV/PHEV (2017-2019)
2017	165	N/A	N/A	102,308
2018	1,454	N/A	N/A	122,631
2019	2,854	N/A	N/A	153,184
2020	5,685	24,191	162,081	N/A
2021	11,382	31,145	196,582	N/A

== Charging infrastructure ==
As of 22 September 2021, there were 693 electric vehicle charging stations (2,285 total chargers) in Thailand. A survey conducted in 2021 by ABeam Consulting Thailand described current charging infrastructure as inadequate.

In Bangkok, the Metropolitan Electricity Authority (MEA) has installed 22 charging stations as of March 2022, with plans to install 100 by December of this year. Energy Absolute has installed 1,900 chargers under its EA Anywhere brand, and plans to add an additional 1,000 by the end of 2022.

In February 2022, the Energy Policy and Planning Office announced plans to install over 500 charging stations by 2030, in addition to over 1,400 battery-swapping stations. Banpu Next and Evolt Technology announced a partnership in February to provide 500 fast charge stations in 2022, and 5,000 by 2025.

In 2020, PTT launched Swap & Go, a battery swapping service and app for electric motorcycles in Bangkok. The company currently operates 22 battery swap stations.

== Transit ==
=== Bangkok Metropolitan Area ===
==== Buses ====
In 2021, there were 118 registered battery electric buses (BEVs) in the Bangkok Metropolitan Area. The Bangkok Metropolitan Administration aims to build a "comprehensive network" of electric buses in Bangkok, and plans to launch two electric bus pilots in 2022 in concert with Electric Vehicles Thailand. The pilot will offer free bus fares on two bus routes, Din Daeng-Sanam Pao BTS station and Rom Klao-Lat Krabang station. As of June 2022, Thai Smile Bus Company operates 27 electric buses on 10 routes within the Bangkok area. The Bangkok Mass Transit Authority plans to modify used internal combustion engine buses to transition them to electric battery-powered vehicles in collaboration with Sakun C Innovation. BMTA will provide the chassis, and Sakun C aims to supply the aluminum body to upgrade the fleet. There are expected to be 1,000 electric buses operating in Bangkok by the end of 2022.

==== Airport taxi ====
The EV Taxi VIP service launched in September 2019 at Suvarnabhumi Airport with 100 BYD e6 cars, serving arriving passengers.

==== Tuk-tuks ====
The government aims to replace gas-powered tuk-tuks with electric models. MuvMi, an electric tuk-tuk rideshare serving 9 neighborhoods, launched in 2018, and currently operates over 800 vehicles. The company seeks to have 1,0000 EV tuk-tuks operating by the end of 2022.

==== Motorbike taxi ====
In December 2021, the Electricity Generating Authority of Thailand began a pilot motorbike taxi service with 51 electric scooters in Bang Kruai district, Nonthaburi province, and 3 battery swap stations.

==== Water transport ====
Electric battery-powered boats have been integrated into both the Chao Phraya River, Khlong Phadung Krung Kasem, and Khlong Saen Saep transit systems. In the Chao Phraya River, Bangkok's major waterway, MINE Smart Ferry service from Sathorn Pier to Nonthaburi via electric boat was launched by E Smart Transport Co in April 2021. The boats are produced by Energy Absolute. In 2022 the service was expanded, with two routes: a Metro line between Sathorn Pier and Rama VII pier, and a City line between Sathorn pier and Pinklao pier.

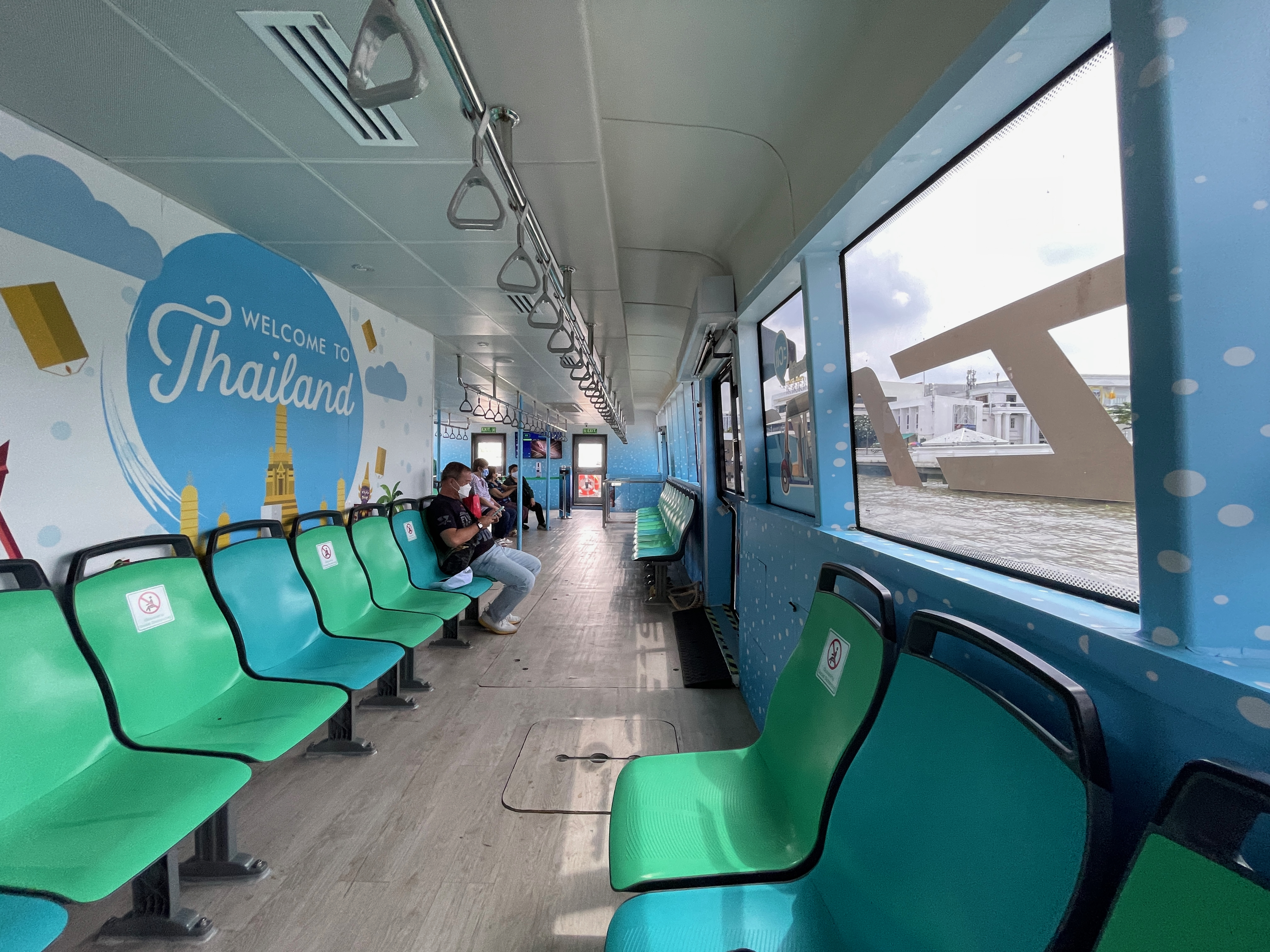
The interior of an electric Smart Ferry on the Chao Phraya River in Bangkok

In November 2020, the city's government launched an electric boat service in Khlong Phadung Krung Kasem. In March 2022, the Khlong Saen Saep boat service's new Bang Kapi-Minburi route began operation of 12 battery-powered canal boats. The service is expected to serve 600–1,000 commuters per day.

==== Rail systems ====
The State Railway of Thailand aims to electrify all rail lines within 500 km of Bangkok. Currently, several railways use diesel locomotives and diesel multiple unit trains, which will be replaced by electric locomotives and train sets. In 2021, the Red Line commuter train services began, using electric trains manufactured by Hitachi on two routes.

=== Ratchaburi ===
The Marine Department plans to launch two electric boats to promote tourism in Khlong Damnoen Saduak.

=== Southern Thailand ===
Banpu Next e-Ferry services launched in 2020, geared towards tourists traveling between Phuket and Phang Nga.

== Industry associations ==
- Electric Vehicle Association of Thailand
