= Comptroller General's Department =

- กรมบัญชีกลาง krom banchi klang

Agency overview
- Formed: 7 October 1890
- Type: Government agency
- Jurisdiction: Nationwide
- Headquarters: Phaya Thai, Bangkok, Thailand
- Agency executive: Comptroller-General Mrs.Patricia Mongkhonvanit
- Parent agency: Ministry of Finance
- Website: www.cgd.go.th

The Comptroller General's Department (CGD) (Thai: กรมบัญชีกลาง; RTGS: krom banchi klang) is a Thai government agency under the Ministry of Finance.

== History ==
In accordance with the Royal Treasury Ministry Act, the Comptroller General's Department was established on 7 October 1890. It was originally named the Accountant-General's Department. Its core mission is to manage the nation's revenues and expenditures as well as royal accounts in order to ensure lawful use of the national budget to the country's benefit.

== Missions ==
The Comptroller General's Department has four main missions as follows:

- Control of the disbursement of funds
- Control of government spending
- Control the government personnel budget
- Support the Ministry of Finance and Government policies
