= Sam Sen Nai Subdistrict =

Sam Sen Nai สามเสนใน
- Khwaeng
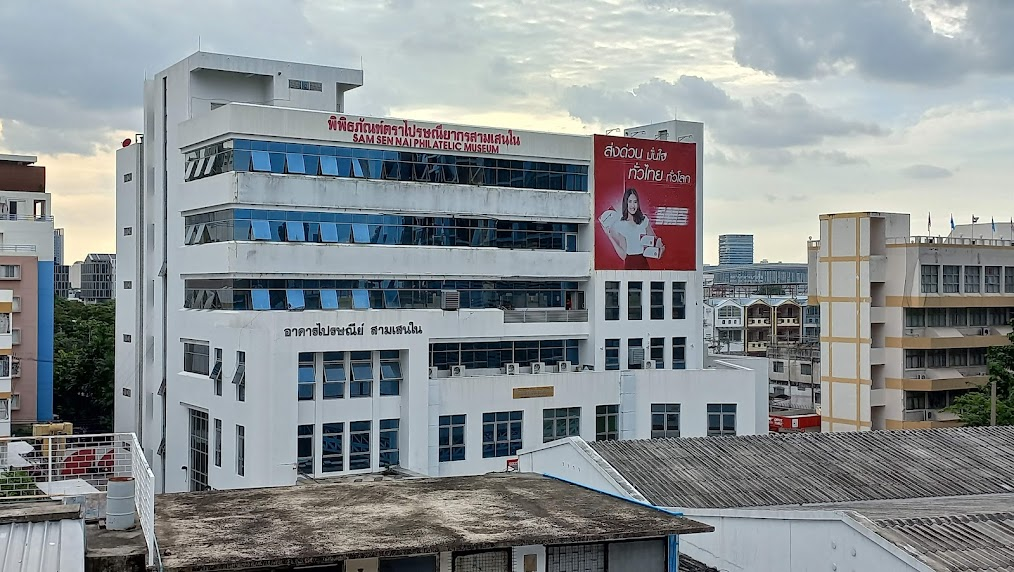
- Sam Sen Nai Philatelic Museum, a museum located in San Sen Nai

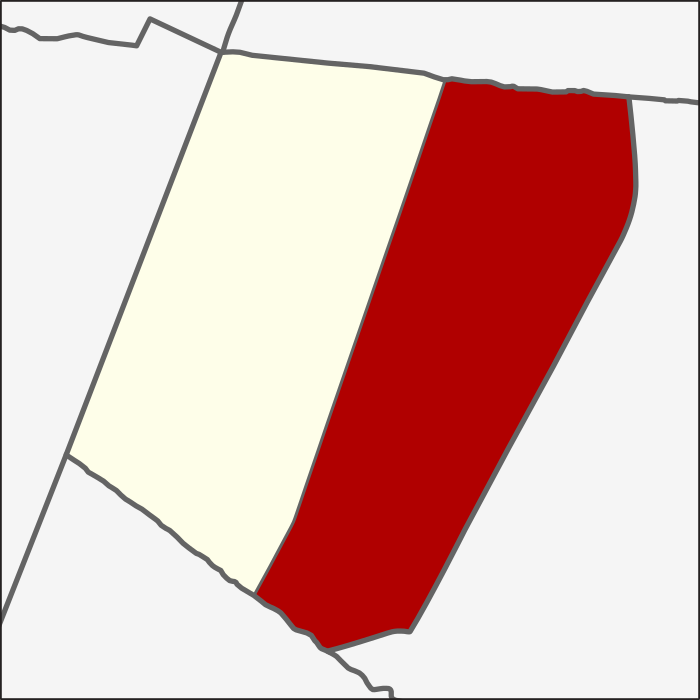
- Location in Phaya Thai District
- Country: Thailand
- Province: Bangkok
- Khet: Phaya Thai

Area
  - Total: 4.923 km^{2} (1.901 sq mi)

Population (2023)
  - Total: 29,479
- Time zone: UTC+7 (ICT)

Sam Sen Nai (Thai: สามเสนใน, pronounced [sǎːm sěːn nǎj]), is a khwaeng (subdistrict) in Phaya Thai District, Bangkok. In 2023, it had a population of 29,479.
