= Ouay Ketusingh =

Thai physician

Ouay Ketusingh (Thai: อวย เกตุสิงห์, RTGS: Uai Ketsing; 3 September 1908 – 20 December 1990) was a Thai physician, known for shaping medical education at the Siriraj Hospital Faculty of Medicine where he was a professor, applying Buddhist philosophy to medicine, pioneering research and applying modern scientific methods to traditional Thai medicine, establishing the field of sports medicine in Thailand, and various other innovations.
