= Ari, Bangkok =

Road and neighborhood in Thailand

Coordinates: 13°46′49″N 100°32′28″E

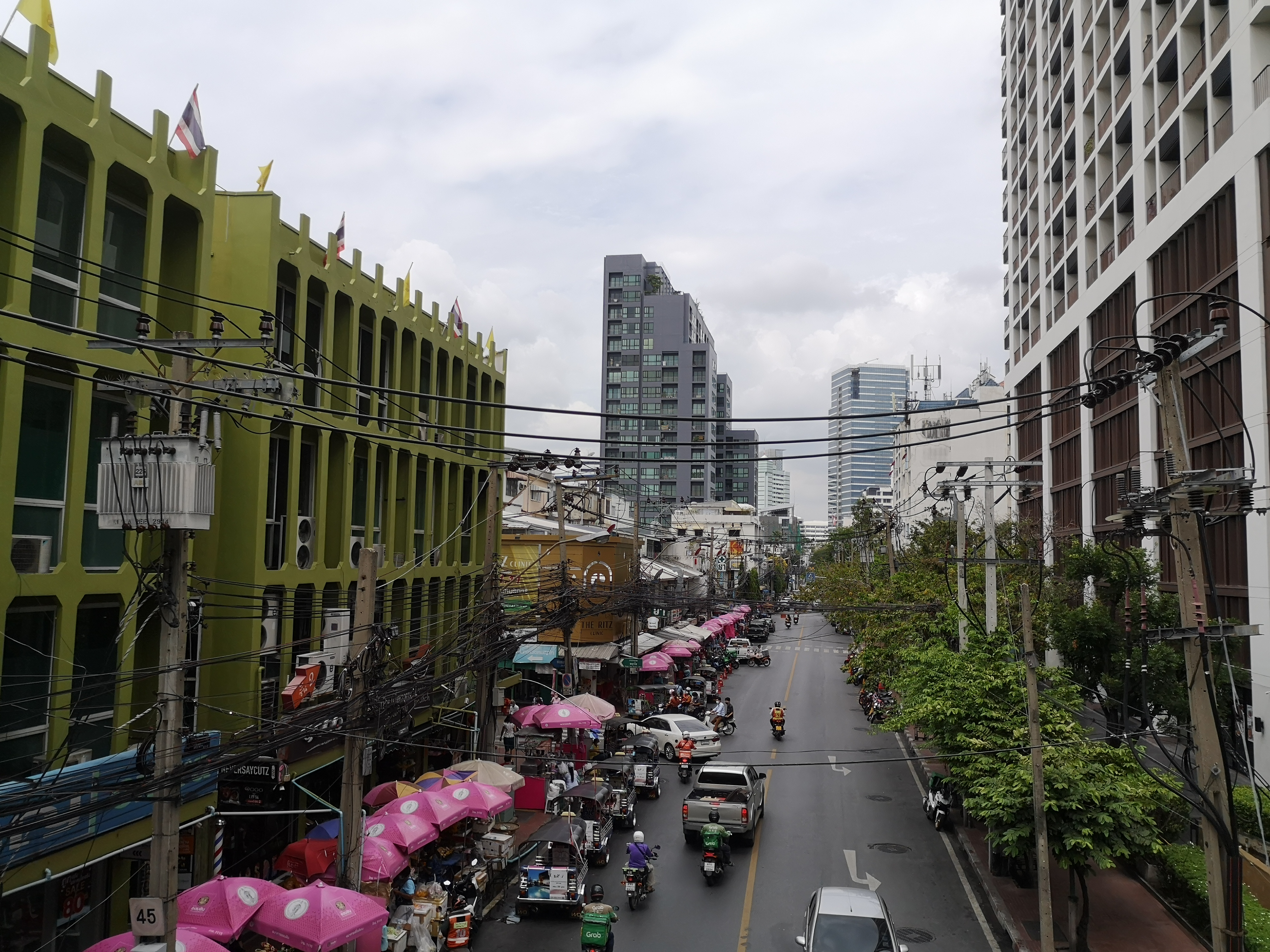
Soi Ari

Ari, also spelled Aree (Thai: อารีย์, pronounced [ʔaː.riː]), is a soi (alley) and residential neighbourhood in Bangkok, Thailand. Today, it is a trendy area popular among younger generations, especially teenagers and young adults. The area is lined with stylish cafés and bakeries, modern restaurants, and leading community-style mall. It is also home to various government offices, including the Ministry of Finance, the State Audit Office, the Ministry of Natural Resources and Environment, and the Public Relations Department. Most of these offices are located toward the end of the soi.

The neighbourhood lies within the Phaya Thai district, centred around Soi Ari (Phahonyothin Soi 7), in an area locally known as Sanam Pao. It has been featured by a number of media outlets including Bloomberg News as one of the best neighbourhoods to travel to in Bangkok, and The New York Times as one of the 47 best in the world.

At the entrance of Soi Ari is Ari station (N5), a BTS Skytrain station located above Phahonyothin Road. The station provides convenient access to the neighbourhood.

== History ==
According to those who lived in this area during the 1950s and 1960s, it was once a quiet residential neighbourhood for aristocrats, old families, and high-ranking government officials. It had yet to become the bustling commercial district it is today. Development in the area began as part of Bangkok's urban expansion outward from the city centre, especially after the extension of Phahonyothin Road, turning this neighbourhood into part of the city's new frontier. Back then, local businesses were simple and modest, mainly small eateries and traditional coffee shops. There were no upscale restaurants or trendy venues. The site where the headquarters of Kasikornbank (KBank) now stands was once just an open vegetable garden. At the far end of the soi, where numerous government agencies are now located, there were no such offices at the time. Instead, the area consisted mainly of open fields. A distinctive landmark was a radio transmission station, notable for having one antenna taller than the others. This later became the site of the Public Relations Department's radio mast, which remains a well-known feature today. Daily life in the neighbourhood was calm and domestic, with most families preferring to cook and eat at home rather than dine out, and by nightfall people usually retired early, giving the area an atmosphere that was quiet and subdued compared to its later liveliness.

Located in the Ari is Suan Bua School, a long-established kindergarten and primary school. Even though most of the students lived nearby, school buses were still provided. It was operated by Dr. Ouay Ketusingh and his wife.

Baan Yoswadi, one of the area's first condominium buildings was founded by Thanpuying Yosawadi Ampornapisarn in the late 1970s. It is considered one of the earliest condominiums in Thailand and is still in operation today.

Within Ari Soi 1, there is a connection to another alley, Soi Ari Samphan. At the end of this soi, it opens out to the Khlong Prapa (water supply canal) along Rama VI Road. Additionally, it can also connect to a nearby street, Phahonyothin Soi 5, also known as Soi Ratchakru.
