= Phaya Thai district =

Phaya Thai พญาไท
- Khet
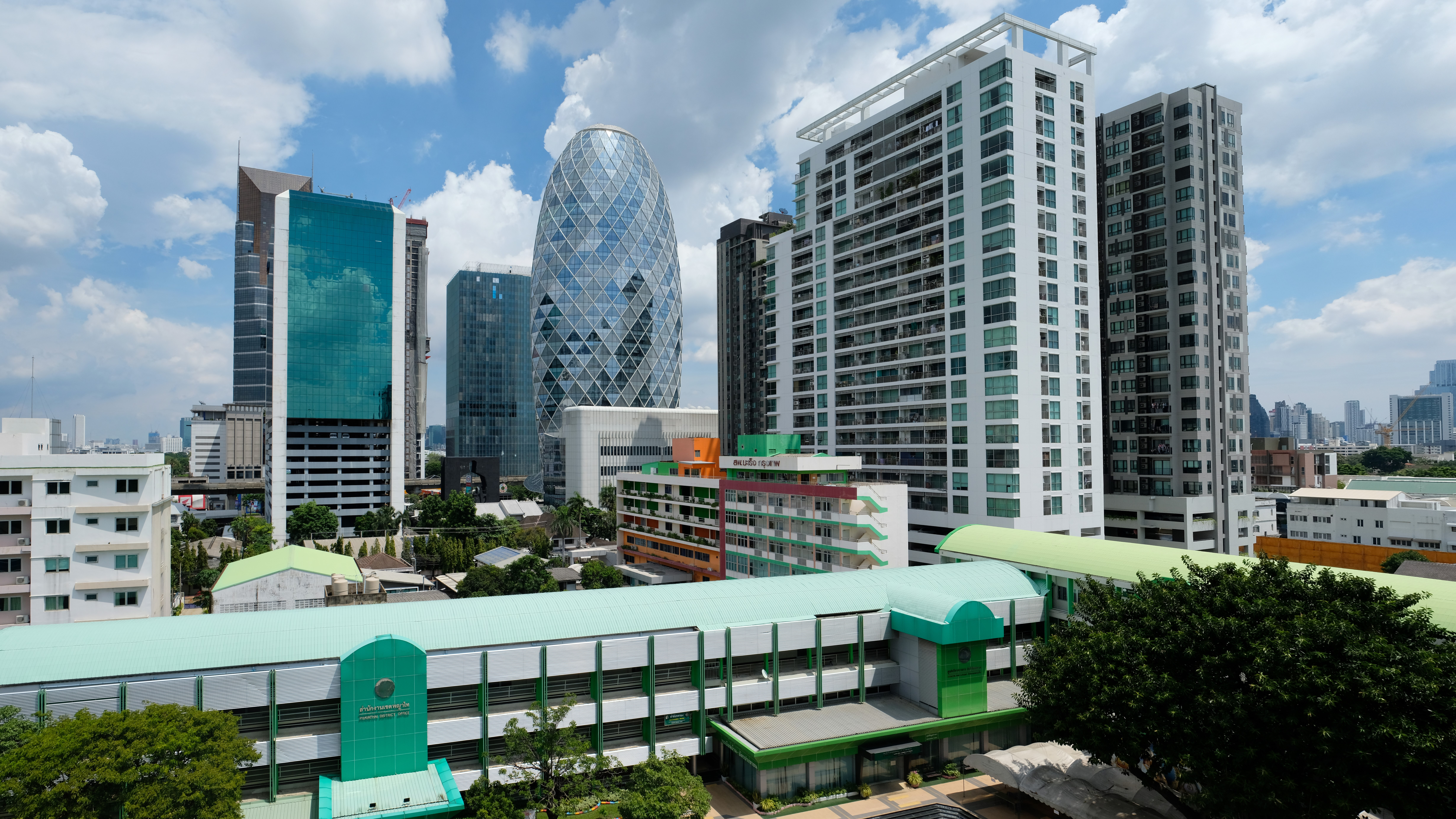
- Buildings in Phaya Thai District

- Khet location in Bangkok
- Coordinates: 13°46′48″N 100°32′34″E
- Country: Thailand
- Province: Bangkok
- Seat: Phaya Thai
- Khwaeng: 2

Area
  - Total: 9.59 km^{2} (3.70 sq mi)

Population (2017)
  - Total: 70,238
  - Density: 7,320.27/km^{2} (18,959.4/sq mi)
- Time zone: UTC+7 (ICT)
- Postal code: 10400
- Geocode: 1014

Phaya Thai (Thai: พญาไท, pronounced [pʰā.jāː tʰāj]) is a district in central Bangkok, Thailand. From the north clockwise, its neighbouring districts are: Bang Sue, Chatuchak, Din Daeng, Ratchathewi, and Dusit. Despite sharing a name, due to boundary changes, Phaya Thai Road and Phaya Thai BTS Station are in the adjoining Ratchathewi District.

== History ==
Phaya Thai district was set up in 1966 by taking areas that were part of Dusit and Bang Kapi Districts. It was named after Phaya Thai palace, which was built in 1909 at King Rama V's behest. Since then, many changes to the district have been made. In 1973, the Huai Khwang district was separated from Phaya Thai. Later in 1978, as an effort to balance the population among districts, the boundaries between Phaya Thai, Huai Khwang, and Bang Kapi Districts were modified. A new Ratchathewi district was created by carving off the southern part of Phaya Thai in 1989. In 1993, some eastern parts were moved out of the district to the newly-formed Din Daeng, leaving Phaya Thai with only one remaining sub-district, Sam Sen Nai.

Due to the split off of Ratchathewi, Phaya Thai Road is no longer in Phaya Thai District. It runs through Ratchathewi and Pathum Wan. Similarly, Phaya Thai BTS Station is in Ratchathewi, on Phaya Thai Road.

During the reign of King Rama VI, Phaya Thai was an area filled with military cantonments. "Sanam Pao" is another familiar name of the area, owing to the original name of Phahonyothin Road, the area's main thoroughfare, and also because it was once used as a military firing range. (Note: In Thai, "Sanam Pao" literally means "target field", referring to a shooting range for firearms practice. The site of this former range corresponds to the area now occupied by Channel 5 and extends towards the Ari neighbourhood.)

== Administration ==
The district is divided into two sub-districts (khwaeng).

Number	Name	Thai name	Area (km^{2})	Population (December 2021)	Population density (December 2021)	Map
1.	Sam Sen Nai	สามเสนใน	4.923	30,476	6,190.53	Map
6.	Phaya Thai	พญาไท	4.672	36,736	7,648.97	Map
Total			9.595	66,212	6,900.68	Map

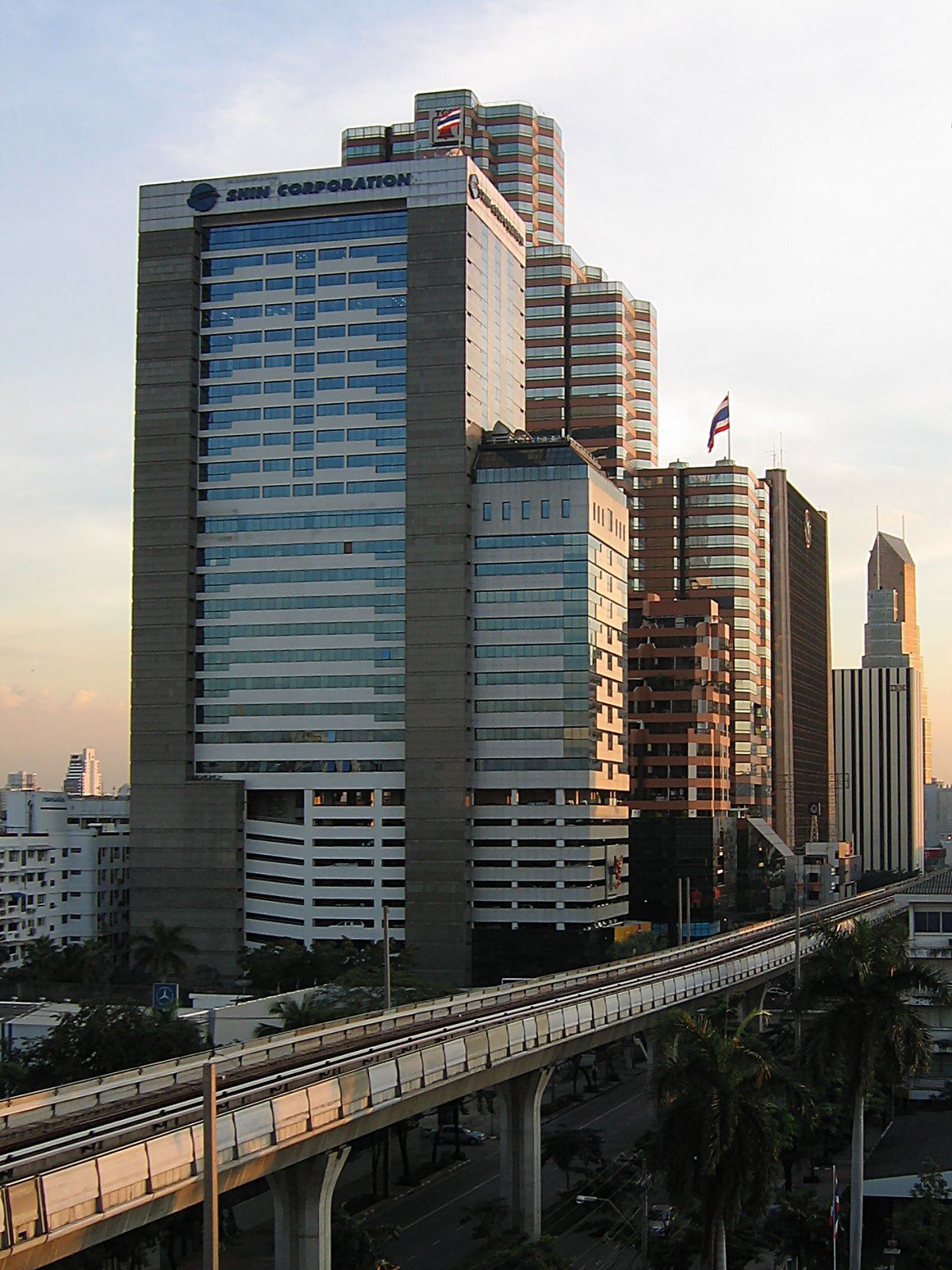
Phahonyothin Road in Phaya Thai

The missing numbers 2, 3, 4 and 5 belong to the sub-districts which were split off to form Ratchathewi district.

== Places ==
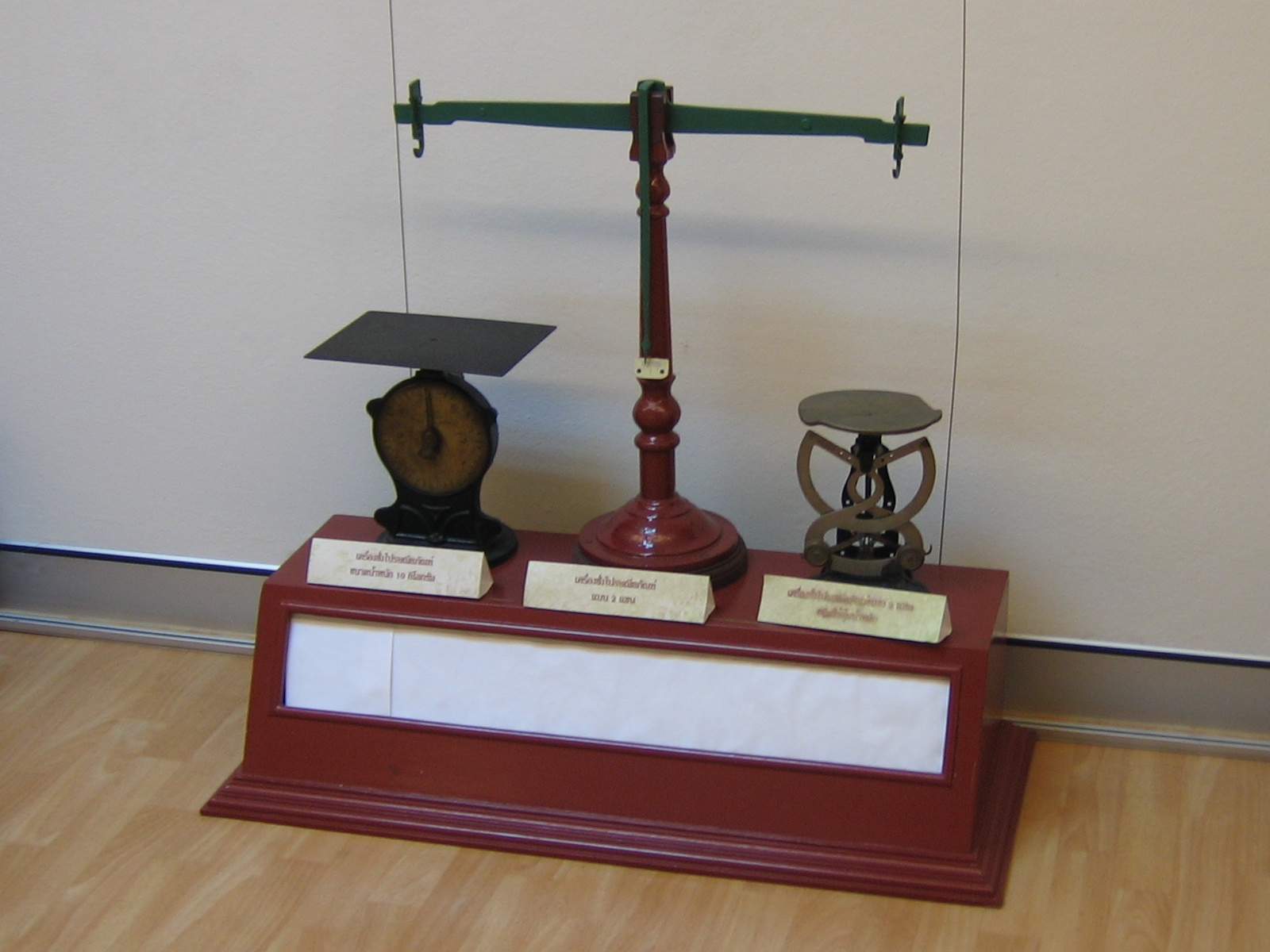
Old weighing scales in Philatelic Museum

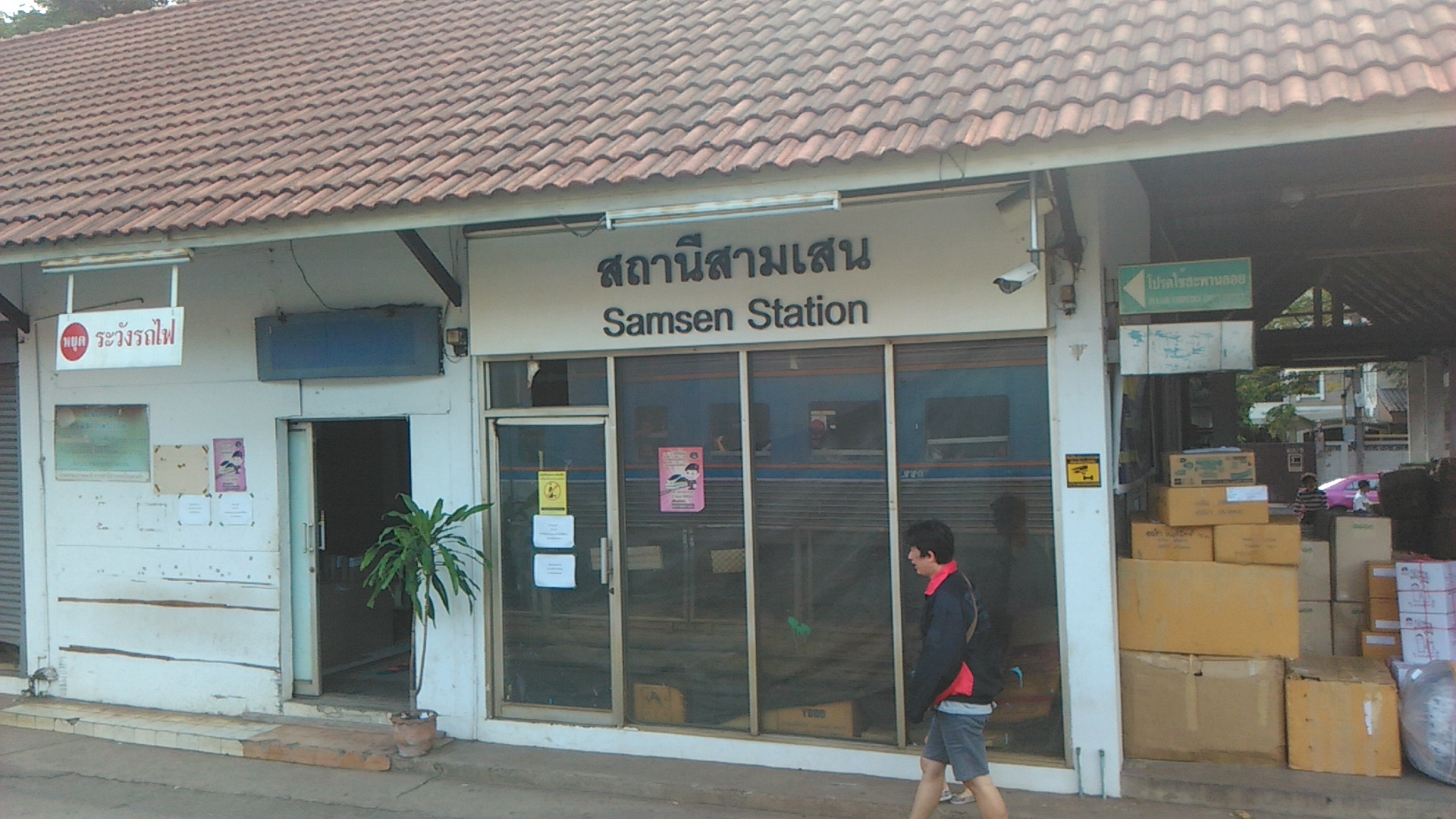
Sam Sen railway station's goods and parcel room (Phaya Thai side)

Phaya Thai is home to many government offices, such as the Government Savings Bank, the Ministry of Finance, and the Ministry of Natural Resources and Environment. A large portion of the district on its east side is occupied by the Royal Thai Army, including the Army Stadium, and the military-owned television Channel 5. Wat Phai Tan (วัดไผ่ตัน) is the only Buddhist temple in the district.

The population is more concentrated in the area called Saphan Khwai (สะพานควาย) with many shops, apartments, and a BigC shopping center.

The Thai Philatelic Museum was renovated and moved to a building behind the Samsen Nai post office at Saphan Khwai in December 2004. Among the exhibits are awards Thai philatelists received from various international competitions together with photocopies of the winning entries, posters depicting rare Thai stamps, and winning postage stamp designs.

== Transportation ==
There are three BTS skytrain stations in Phaya Thai: Sanam Pao, Ari, and Saphan Khwai. The Bangkok MRT station Bang Sue is in the northwest corner of the district.

Phaya Thai is also served by the Sam Sen railway station of the State Railway of Thailand (SRT), which every train (except the Eastern Line) must pass here before reaching (or departing) from Hua Lamphong railway station. The rail tracks also serve as the dividing line between Phaya Thai's Phaya Thai Sub-district and Dusit's Thanon Nakhon Chai Si Sub-district.

== People ==
Former Thai Prime Minister Thaksin Shinawatra (2001–2006) was a police officer who began his career at Phaya Thai Metropolitan Police Station. Shinawatra and his political party, Thai Rak Thai were ousted in a coup in September 2006. (Note: Despite its name, Phaya Thai Metropolitan Police Station is actually situated in the Ratchathewi area.)
