= Campus of Chulalongkorn University =

University grounds in Bangkok, Thailand

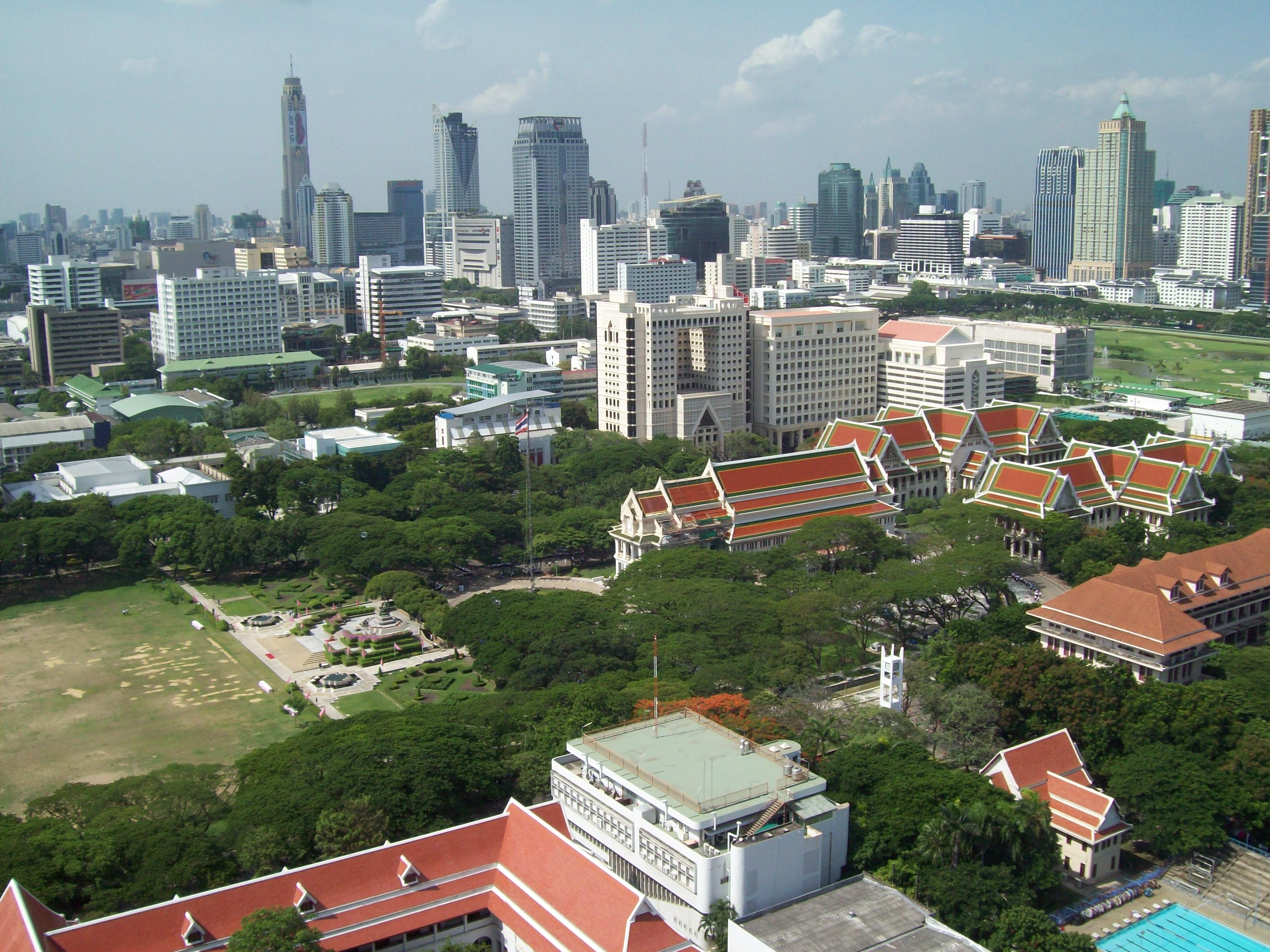
The university campus is dominated by the Auditorium, in front of which stands the Monument of King Chulalongkorn and King Vajiravudh.

The campus of Chulalongkorn University in Bangkok occupies an area of 637 rai (101.9 ha; 252 acres) in the city centre's Pathum Wan District. It accounts for just over half of the 1,153 rai (184.5 ha; 456 acres) of land owned by the university, the rest of which is commercially developed or used by other institutions. The campus sits on what was originally royal land surrounding Windsor Palace, granted for the university's use at its foundation in 1917 by King Vajiravudh. Ownership of the land was transferred to the university by an Act of Parliament in 1939.

At the university's establishment, the campus area consisted mostly of open fields. The first dedicated permanent structure, the Administration Building (now Maha Chulalongkorn Building), was completed in 1921. It was followed in the next three decades by several historic buildings, mostly designed by Phra Sarotrattananimman and showing increasing modern influence, reflecting the country's transition to constitutional monarchy. Many more buildings were built in the second half of the 20th century, and multiple high-rises have been erected since the 2000s. Buildings are now spread throughout most of the university campus, interspersed by green areas of planted groves and lawns, especially the main lawn in front of the Monument of King Chulalongkorn and King Vajiravudh, which forms the campus's central feature.

The university owns most of the land bounded by Rama I Road to the north, Henri Dunant Road to the east, Rama IV Road to the south and Banthat Thong Road to the west. The campus is bisected by Phaya Thai Road, with most of the faculties located on the east side and supporting facilities, residences and administration offices on the west. The academic area is bounded by commercial areas and neighbourhoods to the north, west and south.

== History ==
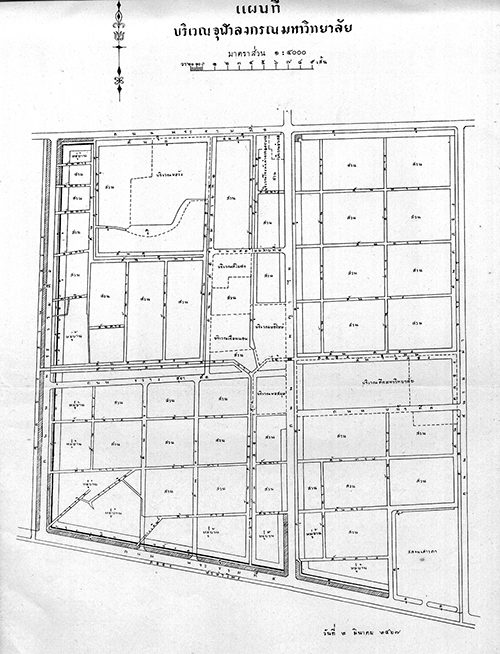
Area map of the university grounds in 1925

The land now occupied by Chulalongkorn University had been cleared for paddy fields around the mid-19th century, and part of it had been claimed by Somdet Chaophraya Borommahaphichaiyat, a high-ranking noble under King Mongkut (Rama IV, r. 1851–1868). From 1880 to 1881, Mongkut's successor and the university's namesake King Chulalongkorn (Rama V, r. 1868–1910) bought up the land, intending it as the estate of a new country palace for his son Crown Prince Vajirunhis, which would become known (among several names) as Windsor Palace. The prince died before taking up residence there, and use of the palace was granted to the Survey School of the Royal Survey Department, then under the Ministry of Agricultural Administration. The school later became the School of the Ministry of Agricultural Administration; the outlying grounds were used for technical practice and became landscaped with irrigation canals.

In 1911, King Vajiravudh (Rama VI, r. 1910–1925) founded the Civil Service College of King Chulalongkorn in honour of his father, and the school was incorporated into one of its departments. Vajiravudh also granted the college use of the entire estate, on a rental agreement with the Privy Purse. In 1917, the college was re-established as Chulalongkorn University.

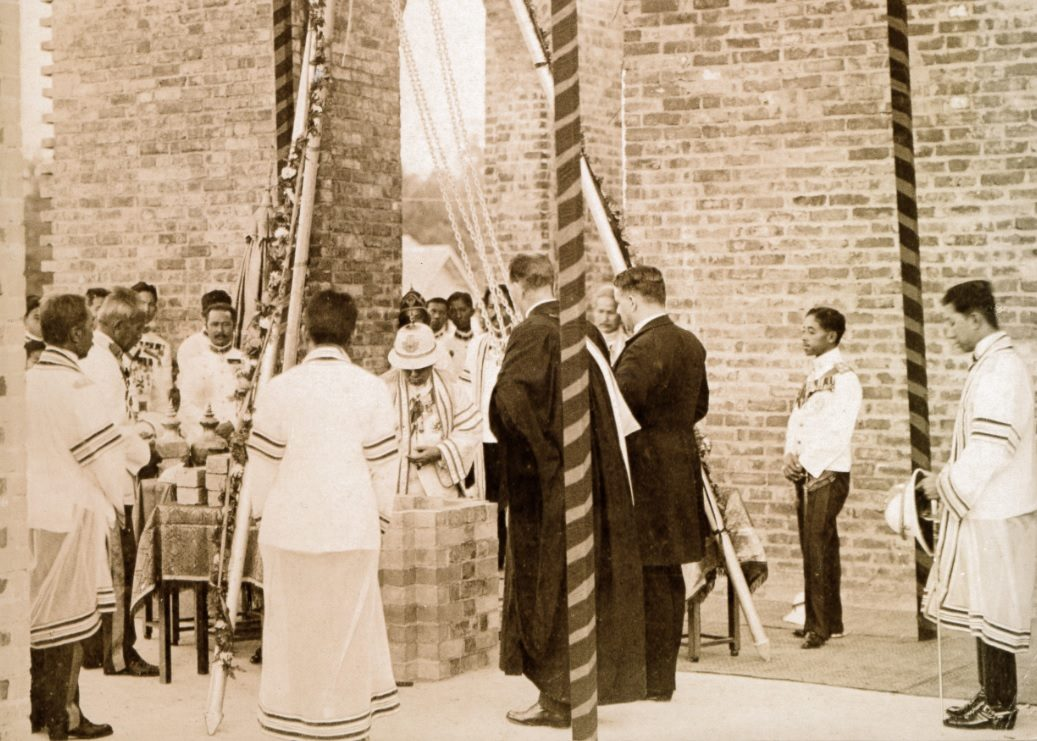
Vajiravudh laid the foundation stone for the Administration Building on 3 January 1916.

The college's administration had laid out a plan for its physical development in 1913, with the eastern side dedicated to academic and administration buildings, and the western side used for agricultural research. The first permanent structure, the Administration Building, was constructed from 1915 to 1921, and became the university's main building. It was followed by the Science Building in 1929 and Chakrabongse Building (hosting the student clubs) in 1933. These early structures, along with the Auditorium (1939), incorporated Thai-style elements with modern construction methods, in contrast to the increasing adoption of modernist architecture following the abolition of absolute monarchy in 1932, influences of which are seen in the Engineering and Physics buildings (1935), Matthayom Horwang School (1936), Chemistry Building (1940), and the Architecture, Dentistry and Pharmaceutical buildings (1941). The majority of these early buildings saw design contributions by Phra Sarotrattananimman, one of the first formally trained Thai architects.

By the 1940s, the campus had come to comprise several buildings lining the large lawn in front of the Auditorium. New administrative buildings were built on the west side in 1941, while Windsor Palace had been demolished for the construction of Supachalasai Stadium (on land leased to the Department of Physical Education) in 1935. The University Preparatory School, situated north of the main cluster, was split off from the university in 1947 and became Triam Udom Suksa School and Patumwan Demonstration School. Together with Uthenthawai School of Construction, they occupy a block that splits the east part of the university campus into separate areas.

The university continued to expand in the second half of the 20th century, with new faculties spreading out to fill the campus. Meanwhile, the university began actively developing areas set aside for commercial real estate development. By the turn of the century, the city had expanded to completely surround the campus, which was now almost entirely built-up. The Monument of King Chulalongkorn and King Vajiravudh was built in 1987 at the end of the main lawn, while groves of rain trees were planted during the university's 80th anniversary. Further expansion in the 21st century necessitated the demolition of older structures to make way for high-rise buildings, several of which now dot the campus.

== Areas ==
The university owns 1,153 rai (184.5 ha; 456 acres) of land in Pathum Wan District, 637 rai (101.9 ha; 252 acres) of which is dedicated to academic use, while the rest is occupied by other institutions or commercially developed by the university.

Most of the academic campus is taken up by the university's constituent faculties, the oldest of which are mostly clustered around the Auditorium and central lawn on the east side. These include the faculties of Arts, Science, Engineering, Architecture, and also Fine and Applied Arts. To the south are the faculties of Commerce and Accountancy, Economics, and Political Science. In the middle of this area are the Sala Phra Kieo multi-purpose hall and Chula Chakrabongse Building, which houses the student clubs and government. North of the main cluster, between Siam Square and the block occupied by Triam Udom Suksa School, are the faculties of Pharmaceutical Sciences, Dentistry, and Veterinary Science, as well as buildings housing several research institutes.

The faculties of Education (including Chulalongkorn University Demonstration School), Law, and Communication Arts occupy the southern end of the campus's west side, while administrative offices, academic and sporting facilities, student dormitories, and other institutes take up most of the rest. Further north, across Soi Chulalongkorn 12 (which serves as a public road), the faculties of Sports Science, Nursing, Psychology, and Allied Health Sciences make use of several buildings which were reacquired by the university from the Department of Physical Education as their lease expired beginning in the 1990s.

East of Henri Dunant Road, the Faculty of Medicine shares its campus with King Chulalongkorn Memorial Hospital of the Thai Red Cross Society.

The campus is bordered to the north, west and south by areas of university land designated for commercial development by the university's Property Management Office or leased to other organizations. These include (anticlockwise from northeast) Siam Square, MBK Center, the National Stadium, the neighbourhoods of Suan Luang and Sam Yan, and Chamchuri Square.

Location of faculties and buildings in Chulalongkorn University:
1. Faculty of Engineering
2. Faculty of Arts
3. Faculty of Science
4. Faculty of Architecture
5. Faculty of Pharmaceutical Sciences
6. Faculty of Veterinary Science
7. Faculty of Commerce and Accountancy
8. Faculty of Dentistry
9. Faculty of Medicine
10. Faculty of Political Science
11. Faculty of Law
12. Faculty of Education
13. Faculty of Communication Arts
14. Faculty of Economics
15. Faculty of Nursing; Faculty of Psychology
16. Faculty of Allied Health Sciences
17. Faculty of Fine and Applied Arts
18. Faculty of Sports Science
19. University offices
20. Sports facilities
21. Student dormitories
1. Ruean Pharotracha
2. Maha Chulalongkorn Building
3. Science Building
4. Chakrabongse Building
5. Engineering Building
6. Physics 1 Building
7. Auditorium
8. Art and Culture Building
9. Chamchuri 1–2 Building
10. Architecture Building
11. Vach Vidyavaddhana Building
12. FAA 1 Building
13. Political Science Building
14. Dentistry 1 Building
15. Arun Sorathet Building
16. Witthaya Phatthana Building
17. Maha Vajiravudh Building
18. Jaiyossompati 1 Building
19. Education 1 & 2 Buildings
20. University Museum
21. Geology and Botany Building
22. CU Demonstration School
23. Engineering 3 Building
24. Chulalongkorn Stadium
25. Sala Phra Kieo
26. Alumni Association

== Architecture ==
The university campus features many noteworthy structures, some of which are listed as heritage buildings.

Name	Image	Year	Description
Ruean Pharotracha & Residence of the Dormitory Warden (Residences of the Principal and professors)		c.1913	The oldest extant structures on the campus, these two buildings belonged to a group originally built as residences, and are now conserved as historic buildings. Pharotracha House received the ASA Architectural Conservation Award in 1997.
Maha Chulalongkorn Building (Administration Building)		1921	Built as the Administration Building to designs by Edward Healey, it held classes for the Faculty of Arts until 1997 when it underwent restoration, and is now reserved for special occasions. It is listed as an ancient monument, and received the ASA Architectural Conservation Award in 1987.
Science Building		1929	Built with funding support from the Rockefeller Foundation to designs by Phra Sarotrattananimman, the building houses the Faculty of Science (today its Biology and Chemistry Departments). It is listed as an ancient monument.
Chakrabongse Building		1933	Designed by Phra Sarotrattananimman and Luang Wisansinlapakam, the building was originally built for student clubs. It is now the University Memorial Hall, and is listed as an ancient monument.
Engineering Building		1935	Designed by Phra Sarotrattananimman and Phra Charoenwitsawakam
Physics 1 Building		1935	Designed by Phra Sarotrattananimman
Auditorium		1939	An auditorium was included in Healey's original plan for the Administration Building group, though a new design by Phra Sarotrattananimman and Phra Phromphichit was made for the actual realization almost two decades later. The building is listed as an ancient monument, and received the ASA Architectural Conservation Award in 2002.
Art and Culture Building (Chemistry 1 Building)		1940	Originally built as the Chemistry Building, strong modernist influences are seen in the design by Phra Sarotrattananimman. The building was re-purposed as the Art and Culture Building in 2007.
Chamchuri 1–2 Building (Secretariat Building & Military Youth Office)		1941	Designed by Lucien Coppé.
Architecture Building		1941	Designed by Lucien Coppé.
Vach Vidyavaddhana Building (Dentistry Building)		1941	Designed by Ercole Manfredi, it is notable for its modernist design.
FAA 1 Building (Pharmaceutical Building)		1941	Designed by Phra Sarotrattananimman originally as the Pharmaceutical Building, it now houses the Faculty of Fine and Applied Arts.
Political Science Building		1952	Designed by Ramphai Yatmongkhran.
Dentistry 1 Building		1955	
Arun Sorathet Building (Sanitary Engineering Department)		1956	Designed by Thom Wattha.
Witthaya Phatthana Building (University Hotel)		1956	Designed by Boonyong Nikrodhananda.
Maha Vajiravudh Building (Central Library)		1957	The long-conceived twin of Maha Chulalongkorn Building, its design was contributed by Boonyong Nikrodhananda. It is listed along with Maha Chulalongkorn as an ancient monument.
Jaiyossompati 1 Building		1959	Designed by Chaloem Rattanathatsani and Boonsong Rohitasuk. It houses the Faculty of Commerce and Accountancy.
Education 1 & 2 Buildings		1960, 62	Designed by An Nimmanahaeminda.
University Museum (Chemistry 3 Building)		1961	Designed by Vira Buranakarn.
Prasom Sthapitanonda (Chemical Technology) Building, Geology and Botany Building, and Greenhouse		1963–64	Designed by Boonyong Nikrodhananda and Lert Urasyananda. Houses departments of the Faculty of Science.
CU Demonstration School		1965	Designed by Boonsong Rohitasuk.
Engineering 3 Building		1965	Designed by Ramphai Yatmongkhran and Boonsong Rohitasuk.
Chulalongkorn Stadium		1966	Designed by Laemchan Hasdin and Sin Phuangsuwan.
Sala Phra Kieo		1967	Multi-purpose hall which previously also held student clubs. Chulalongkorn University Book Center is located in the basement. Designed by Vodhyakara Varavarn and Lert Urasyananda.
Alumni Association		1967	Designed by Jain Sakoltanarak.
Maha Thirarachanusorn Building	Maha Thirarachanusorn Building (1983), designed by Vira Buranakan, houses the Chulalongkorn University Office of Academic Resources, often known as the Chulalongkorn University Library: Chula Library.	1983	Designed by Associate Professor Vira Buranakan, the building was named Maha Thirarachanusorn Building in gratitude to His Majesty King Maha Vajiravudh, the esteemed founder of the University. Construction of the building began in 1980 to house the academic resource institute, previously known as the Center of Academic Resources, following the 1978 decree that merged the Central Library (CL), Audio-Visual Education Center (AV), and Thailand Information Center (TIC). On February 2, 2010, an announcement in the Royal Gazette declared the name change of the Academic Resource Institute to the Center of Academic Resources. Later, on February 27, 2013, a Royal Decree on the restructuring of university departments renamed it the Office of Academic Resources.

== Land ownership ==
The ownership status of the university land has been the subject of controversy on several occasions. In the 1970s, the university was criticized for pursuing commercial real-estate development, to which the faculty responded by laying out historical documents backing its position that Vajiravudh had explicitly intended the land as an endowment to provide income for the university. Calls by the Ministry of Finance for the land to be registered as government property were rebuffed by the 1939 Act of Parliament which transferred ownership of the land from the Crown Property Bureau to the university. More recently, in the 2010s, the university's Property Management Office drew criticism for its redevelopment plans which evicted long-standing communities. The university is also engaged in a long-standing conflict with the Uthenthawai Campus of Rajamangala University of Technology Tawan-ok (the former Uthenthawai School of Construction), which occupies a plot of land which the university seeks to reclaim.
