= Luang Wisansinlapakam =

Chuea Patthamachinda (Thai: เชื้อ ปัทมจินดา, 2 February 1885 – 16 March 1982), better known by the noble title Luang Wisansinlapakam (หลวงวิศาลศิลปกรรม), was a Thai traditional artisan and architect. He worked under various government departments, including the Poh Chang School of Arts and Crafts, where he taught for 17 years. Later in life, he also taught at Silpakorn University, where he was named adjunct professor. He is known for various forms of the traditional visual arts, as well as architecture. He designed numerous Buddhist temples, and is credited with an eclectic output of modern and applied Thai architecture, mostly stemming from various collaborations with Edward Healey and Phra Sarotrattananimman.
