= General Post Office (Bangkok) =

Coordinates: 13°43′37″N 100°30′56″E

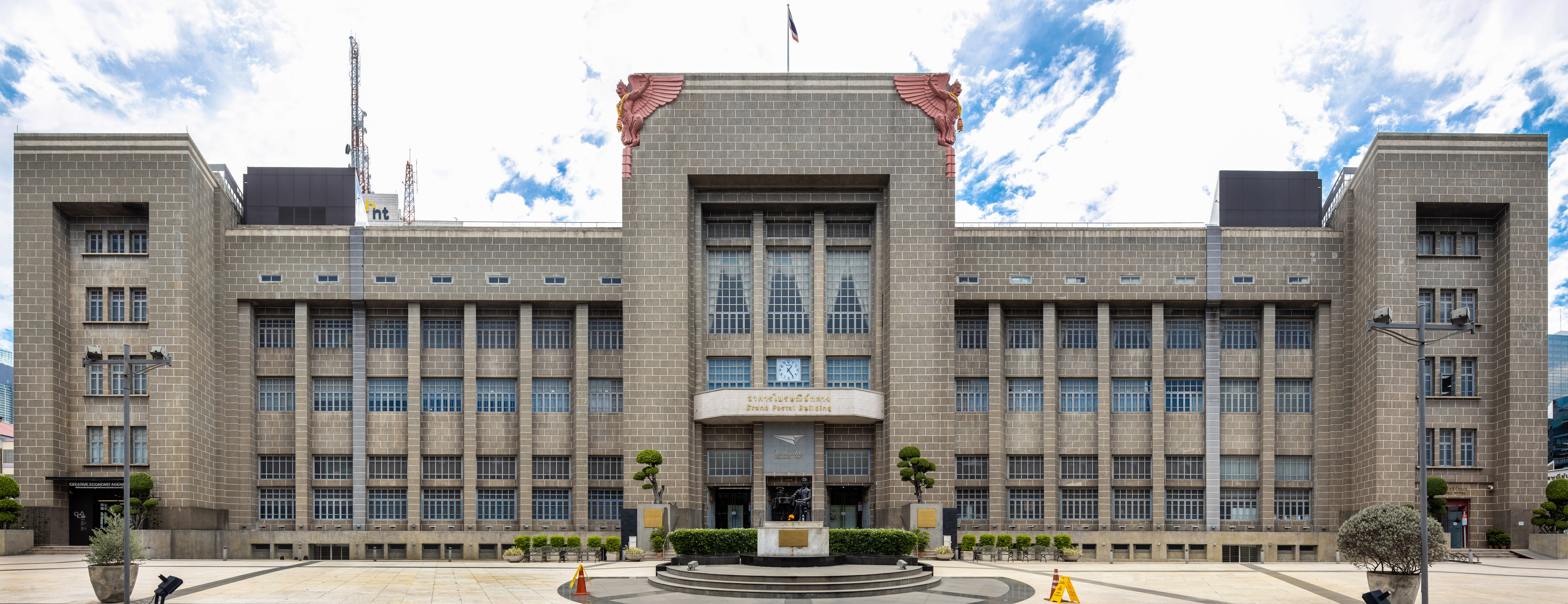
The General Post Office in July 2023

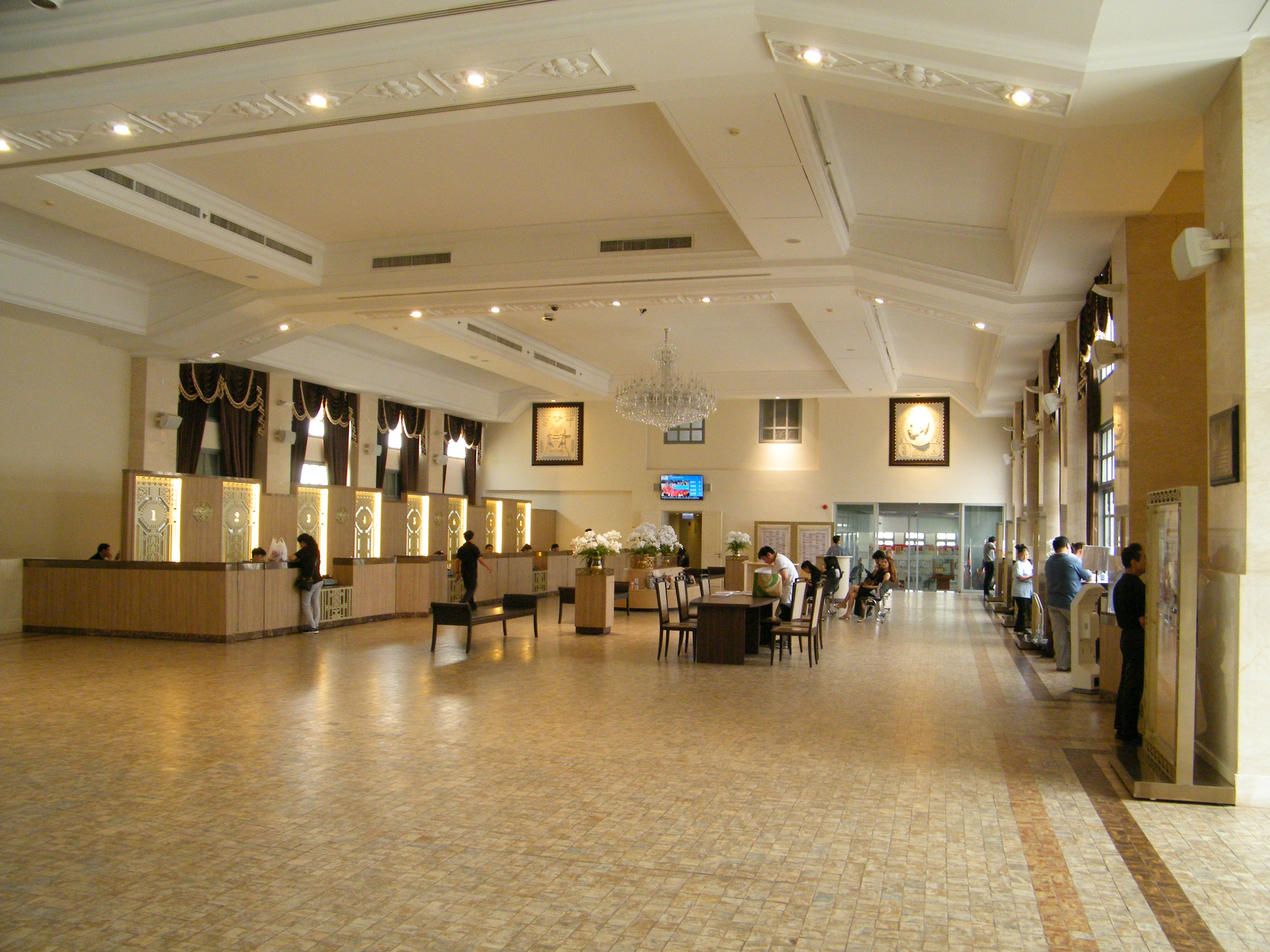
Thailand Post postal service counters on the first floor

The General Post Office (Thai: อาคารไปรษณีย์กลาง, RTGS: Akhan Praisani Klang, pronounced [ʔāː.kʰāːn prāj.sā.nīː klāːŋ]), also known as the Grand Postal Building, is a historic building in the Bang Rak District of Bangkok. Opened on 24 June 1940 on the former site of the British Legation, it was designed by architects Sarot Sukkhayang and Mew Aphaiwong in a mixture of Art Deco and International Style architecture which reflected the desire of the ruling People's Party to project a modern and powerful image of the state.

In 2017, the building was converted for use as the new headquarters of the Thailand Creative & Design Center (TCDC). The conversion received the ASA Architectural Conservation Award in the New Design in Heritage Contexts category for 2020–2021. A branch post office of Thailand Post remains at the building, providing postal services to the general public.
