= Chitsen Aphaiwong =

Thai architect

Chitsen Aphaiwong (Note: Name จิตรเสน may be transliterated as RTGS: Chittasen, Chitrasen, or Chittarasen depending on the choice of pronunciation of which no record exists. His name has been variously transcribed to Chitrasen, Chittrasaen, Jit Sen, Jitrasen, Jittasen, Jitsen, or Jitrsen.)
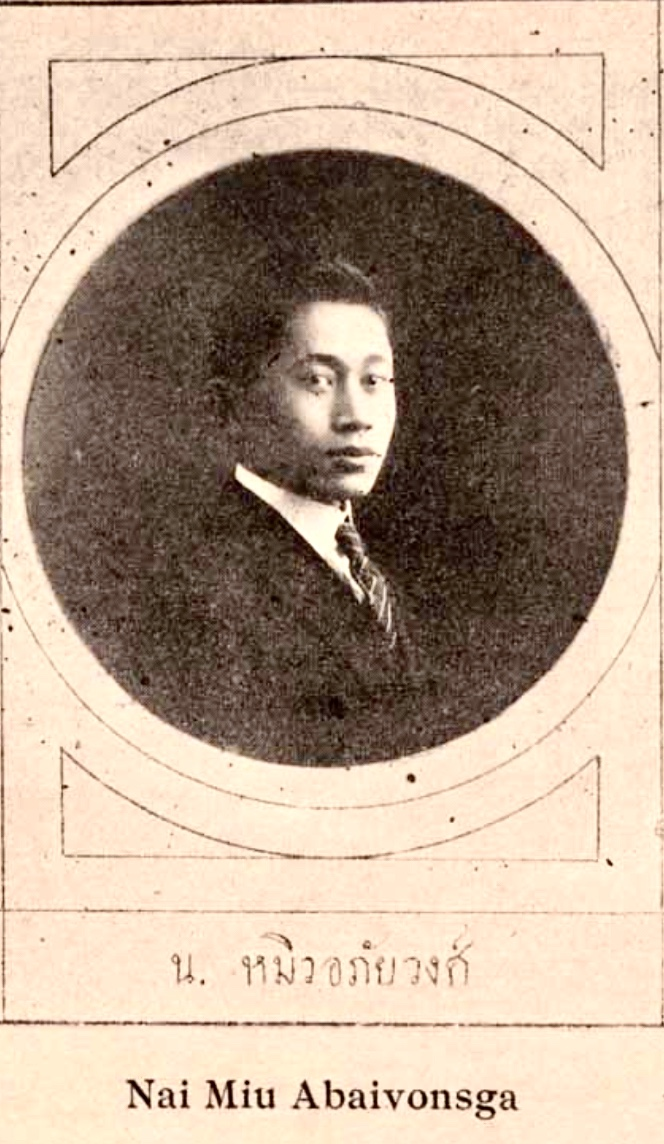
- Chitsen, then named Miu, (Note: Name หมิว has been transliterated as Mew and Miu) in an Assumption College's 1920 publication
- Born: 1905; Thailand
- Died: 1963 (aged 57–58)
- Education: Assumption College; École des Beaux-Arts
- Occupation: Architect
- Buildings: Suphatchalasai Stadium; Democracy Monument; Sala Chaloem Thai; Bangkok General Post Office; Dome Building; Royal Rattanakosin Hotel

Chitsen Aphaiwong (Thai: จิตรเสน อภัยวงศ์) or formerly Mew Aphaiwong (Thai: หมิว อภัยวงศ์ (1905–1963) was a Thai architect with prominent works in Art Deco and International Style. He was regarded as one of the most important pioneers of such architectures in Thailand. Some of his prominent works are Suphatchalasai Stadium, Sala Chaloem Thai, Bangkok General Post Office, and buildings on Ratchadamnoen Avenue including the Royal Rattanakosin Hotel and Bangkok City Library.

A member of the House of Aphaiwong, Chitsen was born to Chao Phraya Aphai Phubet (Chum Aphaiwong) and Mom Thanom. His two other siblings were Khru Sawaeng Aphaiwong; a prominent figure in Thai classical music, and Phean Aphaiwong. Former Prime Minister of Thailand Khuang Aphaiwong was his older half-brother. Chitsen was married to Mary Ericsson, (Note: Thai sources cited her name as "เมรี่ เอเร็คเซิน" (RTGS: Meri Ereksoen)) a Thai-Swedish. He graduated school from Assumption College in Bangkok (in the French-language department) and went on to study architecture at École des Beaux-Arts in France.

== Works ==
Chitsen Aphaiwong had worked closely with the People's Party, incorporating elements of Art Deco architecture and the party's values into his designs. The style with such unique elements is termed Khana Ratsadon's architecture. His contribution includes the buildings on the Ratchadamnoen Klang Avenue (which includes the Bangkok City Library and Royal Rattanakosin Hotel) and the now-demolished Sala Chaloem Thai.

The Bangkok General Post Office in Bang Rak district was designed by Aphaiwong and Sarot Sukkhayang - another prominent pioneer of modern architect in Thailand - in International Style. Details included to reflect the ideology of the People's Party include the number of pillars on each wing that add up to six to illustrate the six core values. Aphaiwong and Sukkhayang had worked together on other projects, including Suphatchalasai Stadium.

Some of his recognised works are:

- Dome Building, Thammasat University Tha Phra Chan campus, Bangkok
- Bangkok General Post Office, Bangkok – jointly designed with Sarot Sukkhayang
- Suphatchalasai Stadium, Bangkok – jointly designed with Sarot Sukkhayang
- Series of buildings on the Ratchadamnoen Klang Avenue, Bangkok – jointly designed with Sarot Sukkhayang and ML Pum Malakul
  - Bangkok City Library
  - Royal Rattanakosin Hotel
  - Sala Chaloem Thai (demolished)
- Chitsen's house at 4 Soi Yen Akat, Bangkok (now a private commercial property)
- Thahan Bok Cinema, Lopburi
- Songkhla District Court, Songkhla
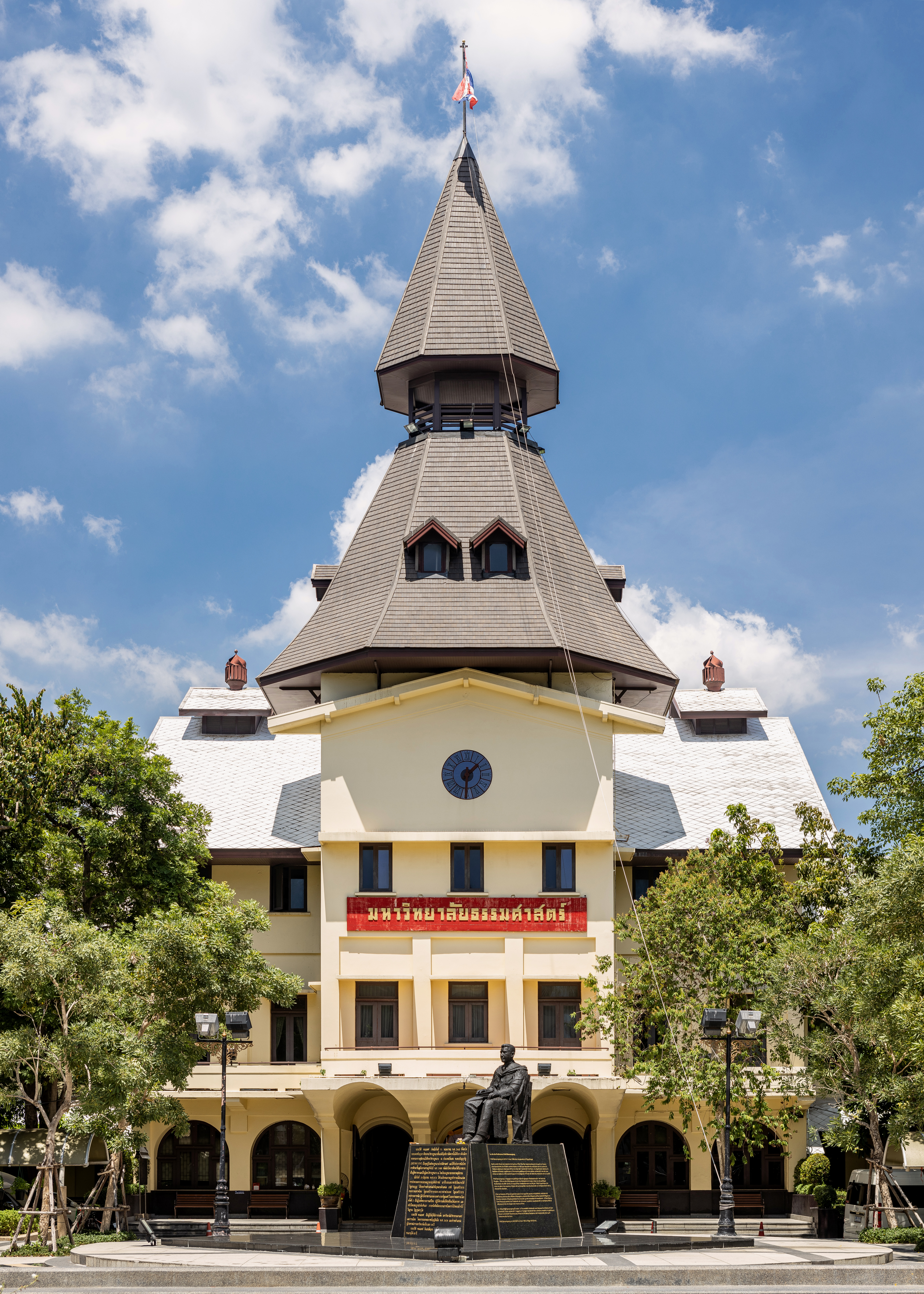
Dome Building, Thammasat University

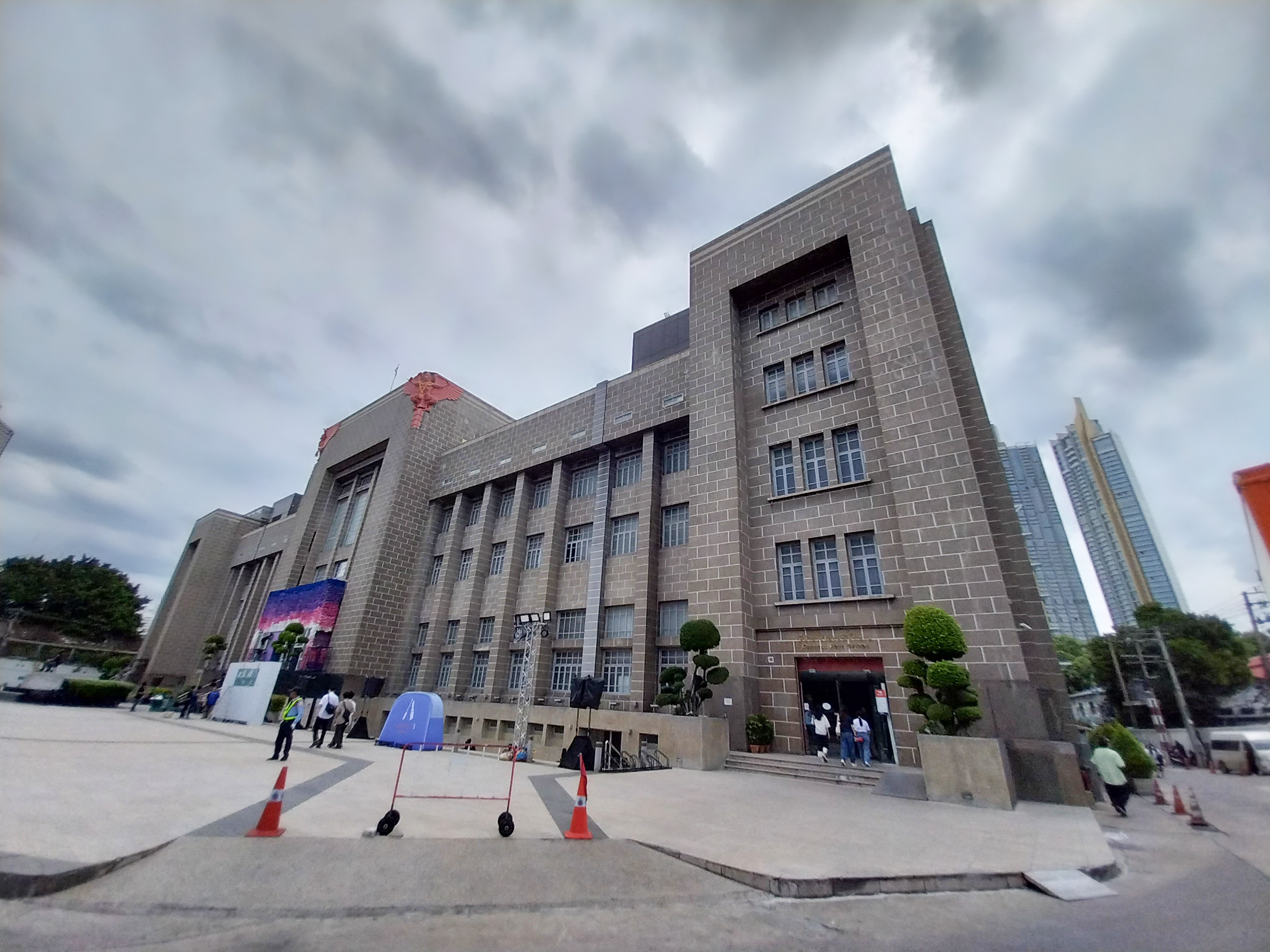
Bangkok General Post Office

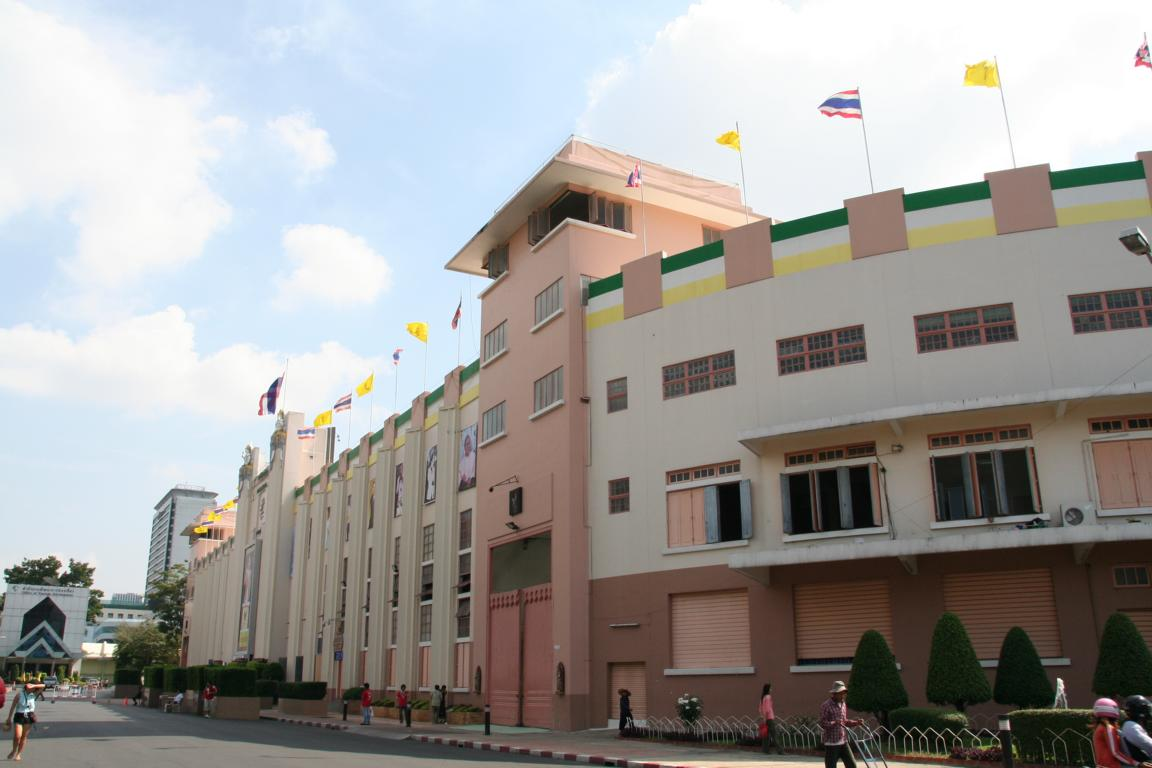
Suphatchalasai Stadium

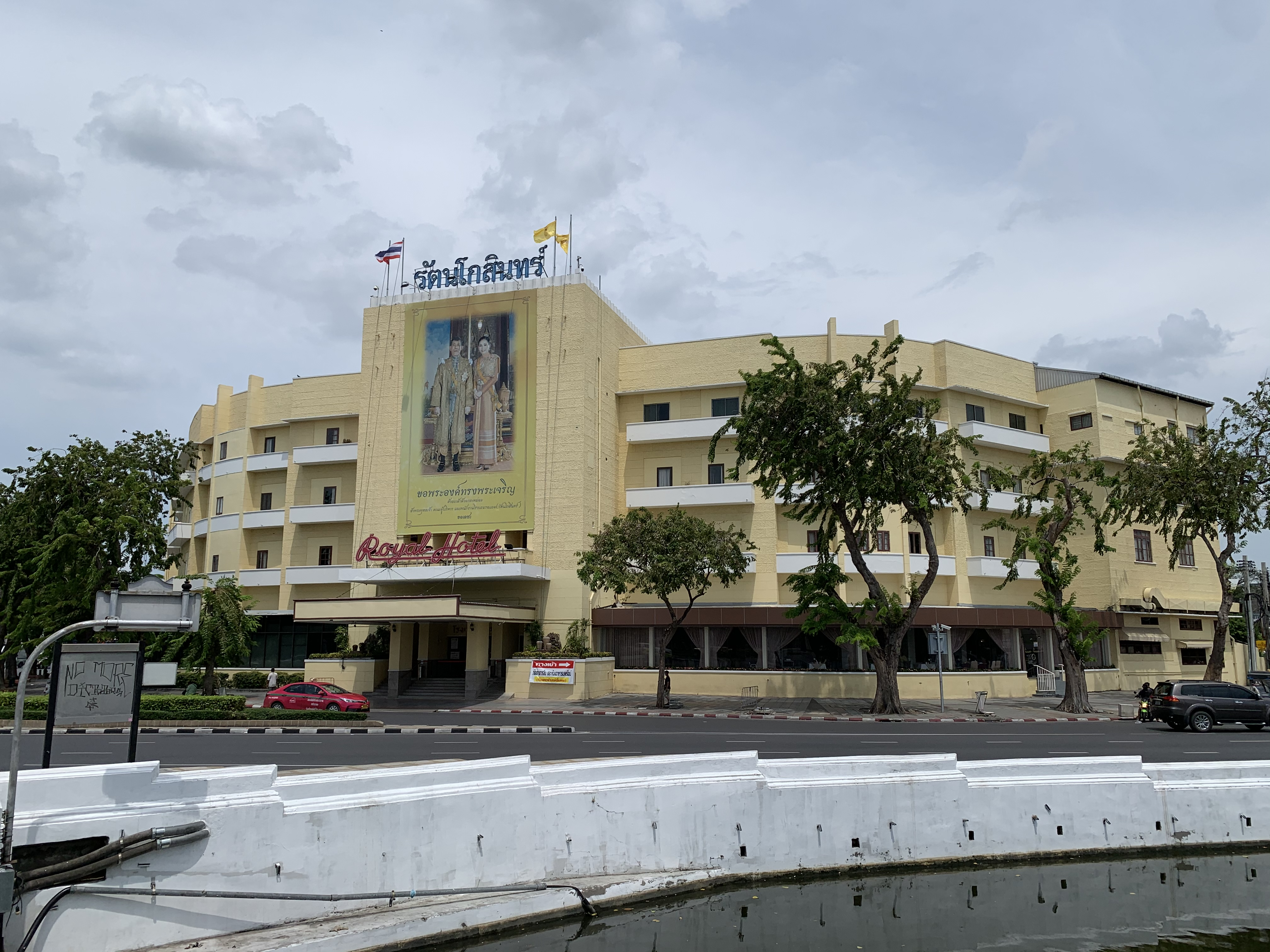
Royal Rattanakosin Hotel

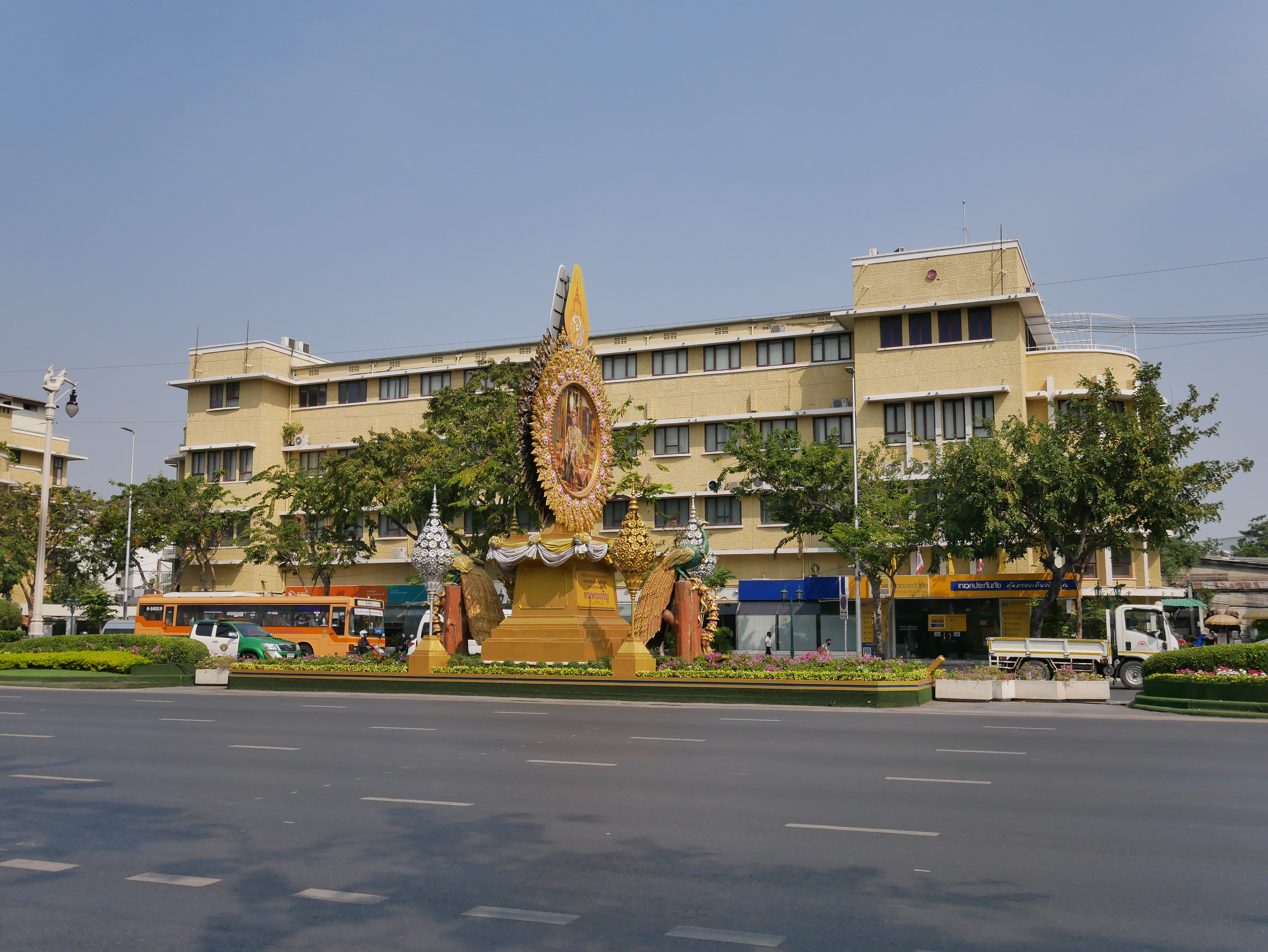
Buildings along the Ratchadamnoen Klang Avenue
