= Wat Buppharam =

Wat Buppharam may refer to:

- Wat Buppharam, Chiang Mai (วัดบุพพาราม), a Buddhist temple in Chiang Mai
- Wat Buppharam, Penang (วัดบุปผาราม), a Buddhist temple near George Town, Penang, Malaysia
- Wat Buppharam, Trat (วัดบุปผาราม), a Buddhist temple in Trat
- Wat Suan Dok, also known as Wat Buppharam (วัดบุปผาราม), a Buddhist temple in Chiang Mai
