= Wat Ban Kao =

- วัดบ้านเก่าจมน้ำ

Religion
- Affiliation: Theravada Buddhism
- Ecclesiastical or organisational status: Submerged

Location
- Location: Ko subdistrict, Li district, Lamphun province, Thailand
- Country: Thailand
- Interactive map of Wat Ban Kao
- Coordinates: 17.6763°N 98.7662°E

Architecture
- Type: Buddhist temple
- Established: 1955

Wat Ban Kao (Thai: วัดบ้านเก่าจมน้ำ) is a submerged former Buddhist temple in Ko subdistrict, Li district, Lamphun province, Thailand. It is located at Kaeng Ko in Mae Ping National Park, near the former communities of Ban Ko Chok and Ban Ko Nong. The temple remains are normally underwater due to the reservoir formed by Bhumibol Dam. They become visible when the water level falls.

== History ==
Wat Ban Kao was built in 1955 (BE 2498). It was originally a temple for the communities of Ban Ko Chok and Ban Ko Nong along the Ping River. The temple was later submerged after the construction of Bhumibol Dam raised the water level of the Ping River. Residents of the two communities moved to higher ground.

The former temple and settlement are now within the reservoir at Kaeng Ko. The remains are normally underwater but become visible when the reservoir level falls.

The temple was part of the home community of Khruba Chaiyawongsa Phatthana, who was born in the former Ban Ko area. A local ceremony called Song Nam Wat Ban Kao is held at the site in April each year. Devotees from several areas take part in the ceremony.

== Remains ==
The temple ruins include old bricks, sections of the temple wall, and a statue of Khruba Chaiyawongsa Phatthana. A large rain tree (Thai: ต้นฉำฉา) also stands in the reservoir near the ruins.

When the water level falls, parts of the temple become visible, including the entrance arch and the top of a chedi. Visitors can reach the site by boat from Kaeng Ko when the water level permits access.

In 2026, the Lamphun Provincial Administrative Organization surveyed Wat Ban Kao and the large rain tree at Kaeng Ko as possible historical tourism attractions.
