= Khwai Phueak Khao Kaeo =

Khwai Phueak Khao Kaeo (Thai: ควายเผือกเขาแก้ว, lit. 'Crystal-Horned White Buffalo') is a legendary white buffalo from Chiang Rai province, Thailand. Its story is linked to Doi Khao Khwai Kaeo and Wat Phra That Doi Khao Kwai. According to local tradition, the mountain was named Doi Khao Khwai Kaeo, also known as Doi Khao Khwai, after a crystal buffalo horn was found there.

The buffalo is also called Khwai Phueak Kaeo Khao Saeng (Thai: ควายเผือกแก้วเขาแสง) in local accounts. The mountain also has a separate legend about Sihuhata, a creature with four ears and five eyes.

== Legend ==
According to a local legend recorded by Mae Fah Luang University's Chiang Rai Database, a white buffalo lived with its mother and a herd of buffalo on the mountain. The young buffalo was said to be a bodhisattva and had a crystal horn. As it grew older, it became the leader of the herd because of its strength and intelligence. Many years later, an elderly couple went to farm near the mountain and found the buffalo's crystal horn. The mountain was then named Doi Khao Khwai Kaeo.

The same source tells another story set several hundred years later. A mother and son lived south of the ancient city of Phanthumati. They raised a female buffalo that gave birth to a white calf said to have come from heaven. The calf's horns grew long before it died. Years later, a farmer found the buffalo's skull and horns buried in sand. He polished one of the horns and discovered that it was made of crystal. The horn was believed to bring good fortune, and the farmer became wealthy. The mountain was then called Doi Khao Khwai Kaeo.

== Related traditions ==
Another local legend from the mountain tells the story of Sihuhata, a creature with four ears and five eyes that eats burning charcoal and produces gold as excrement. In the story, a poor man named Ai Thukkata captures the creature and becomes wealthy. He later becomes ruler and builds a temple on the mountain where Sihuhata was captured.

Both legends concern Doi Khao Khwai Kaeo. The white buffalo story explains the name of the mountain, while the Sihuhata story explains the founding of Wat Phra That Doi Khao Kwai.
