= University Auditorium =

University Auditorium is a name used by multiple universities for auditorium spaces. It may refer to:

- Chulalongkorn University Auditorium
- Eisenhower Auditorium, originally named University Auditorium
- Indiana University Auditorium
- University Auditorium (DePaul University)
- University Auditorium (Gainesville, Florida)
