= ASA Architectural Conservation Award =

Annual award for architectural conservation in Thailand

The Architectural Conservation Award (Thai: รางวัลอนุรักษ์ศิลปสถาปัตยกรรมดีเด่น) is given by the Association of Siamese Architects in recognition of architectural conservation efforts by both the public and private sectors in Thailand. The awards, first given in 1982 and held annually since 2004, are presented to multiple winners in three categories, namely: buildings, people/organizations, and vernacular communities.

== List of recipients ==
=== Buildings ===
Name	Province	Year	Building type
Crown Property Bureau Headquarters (Wang Ladawan)	Bangkok	1982	Public
Dusit Samoson (Phraya Prasertsuphakit Residence)	Bangkok	1982	Public
Neilson Hays Library	Bangkok	1982	Public
Sunanthalai (Royal Seminary) Building, Rajini School	Bangkok	1982	Public
Tamnak Plai Noen	Bangkok	1982	Public
Vajiravudh College	Bangkok	1982	Public
Phuket Provincial Hall	Phuket	1982	Public
Hua Hin Railway Station	Prachuap Khiri Khan	1982	Public
Songkhla Governor's Residence (Phra Tamnak Khao Noi)	Songkhla	1982	Public
O.P. Place	Bangkok	1982	Commercial
Siam Commercial Bank, Talat Noi Branch	Bangkok	1982	Commercial
Siam Commercial Bank, Thanon Petchaburi Branch	Bangkok	1982	Commercial
Abdulrahim House	Bangkok	1982	Residential
Nai Lert House	Bangkok	1982	Residential
No. 139 Soi Thian Siang	Bangkok	1982	Residential
Ubosot, Wat Thong Nophakhun	Bangkok	1982	Religious
British Embassy (revoked following demolition in 2019)	Bangkok	1984	Public
Mathayom Wat Benchamabophit School	Bangkok	1984	Public
Multi-purpose Auditorium, Royal Turf Club of Thailand	Bangkok	1984	Public
Office of the East Asiatic Company	Bangkok	1984	Public
Phaya Thai Palace	Bangkok	1984	Public
Royal Thai Survey Department	Bangkok	1984	Public
Silom Village Trade Center	Bangkok	1984	Public
Varadis Palace	Bangkok	1984	Public
Ancient Siam (Mueang Boran)	Samut Prakan	1984	Public
Thanachart Bank, Tha Phra Chan Branch	Bangkok	1984	Commercial
American Ambassador's Residence	Bangkok	1984	Residential
French Ambassador's Residence	Bangkok	1984	Residential
Khunying Pornpan Tharanumas Residence	Bangkok	1984	Residential
Portuguese Ambassador's Residence	Bangkok	1984	Residential
Wanglee House	Bangkok	1984	Residential
Khum Sai Thong	Chiang Mai	1984	Residential
Phya Kham Mongkhol House	Chiang Mai	1984	Residential
Thub Kwan Residence, Sanam Chandra Palace	Nakhon Pathom	1984	Residential
Ho Trai, Wat Thung Si Mueang	Ubon Ratchathani	1984	Religious
Maha Chulalongkorn Building (Faculty of Arts Building)	Bangkok	1987	Public
Queen Saovabha Memorial Institute	Bangkok	1987	Public
Royal Thai Army Headquarters	Bangkok	1987	Public
Somdet Chaopraya Institute of Psychiatry Museum	Bangkok	1987	Public
Phra Nakhon Si Ayutthaya Municipal Court	Phra Nakhon Si Ayutthaya	1987	Public
Ban Chakrabongse (Chakrabongse Palace)	Bangkok	1987	Residential
Dutch Ambassador's Residence	Bangkok	1987	Residential
Ruean Lanna Khan Tok	Chiang Mai	1987	Residential
Hongyok House	Phuket	1987	Residential
Ho Trai, Wat Rakhang Khositaram	Bangkok	1987	Religious
Holy Rosary Church	Bangkok	1987	Religious
Sim, Wat Chaeng	Ubon Ratchathani	1987	Religious
Silpakorn University Art Gallery	Bangkok	1989	Public
Thai Khu Fa Building, Government House	Bangkok	1989	Public
National Gallery	Bangkok	1989	Public
Parusakawan Palace	Bangkok	1989	Public
Chiang Mai British Consulate (former)	Chiang Mai	1989	Public
Nan National Museum	Nan	1989	Public
Ratchaburi Municipal Court	Ratchaburi	1989	Public
Ubon Ratchathani National Museum	Ubon Ratchathani	1989	Public
Thanachart Bank, Phuket Branch	Phuket	1989	Commercial
Grand Vihara, Wat Ratchapradit Sathitmahasimaram	Bangkok	1989	Religious
Vihara, Wat Prasat	Chiang Mai	1989	Religious
Wat Inthrawat (Wat Ton Kwen)	Chiang Mai	1989	Religious
Vihara, Wat Sob Li	Lampang	1989	Religious
Ordination Hall, Wat Niwetthammaprawat	Phra Nakhon Si Ayutthaya	1989	Religious
Suriyanuwat Building	Bangkok	1993	Public
Bang Khun Phrom Palace	Bangkok	1993	Public
Center for the Promotion of Arts and Culture, Chiang Mai University	Chiang Mai	1993	Public
Nakhon Lampang Railway Station	Lampang	1993	Public
Wat Yang Na Rangsi Boat Museum	Lop Buri	1993	Public
Watchari Romaya Residence, Sanam Chandra Palace	Nakhon Pathom	1993	Public
Phra Nakhon Khiri National Museum	Phetchaburi	1993	Public
Phrae Governor's Residence	Phrae	1993	Public
Phra Thi Nang Songtham, Wat Amphawan Chetiyaram	Samut Songkhram	1993	Public
Saraburi Provincial Court	Saraburi	1993	Public
Former Sing Buri Provincial Court	Sing Buri	1993	Public
The Gallery	Chiang Mai	1993	Commercial
Shops and Houses of Phuket City Centre (Ancient Rowhouses)	Phuket	1993	Commercial
Rachinuthit Building (Mueang Udonthani Museum)	Udon Thani	1993	Commercial
Tamnak Prathom	Nonthaburi	1993	Residential
Wongburi House	Phrae	1993	Residential
Mandapa of the Reclining Buddha, Wat Chetawan	Lamphun	1993	Religious
Ho Trai, Wat Tha Khae	Lop Buri	1993	Religious
Monks' Residence, Wat Wang Tawantok	Nakhon Si Thammarat	1993	Religious
Wat Chaloem Phrakiat	Nonthaburi	1993	Religious
Old Ordination Hall, Wat Had Siao	Sukhothai	1993	Religious
Octagonal Mandapa, Wat Uposatharam	Uthai Thani	1993	Religious
Royal Thai Navy Headquarters (Thonburi Palace)	Bangkok	1994	Public
Tamnak Yaowapha (Arts and Culture Centre, Suan Dusit Rajabhat University)	Bangkok	1994	Public
Suan Kularb Palace Throne Hall	Bangkok	1994	Public
Suan Pakkad Palace	Bangkok	1994	Public
Overbrook Hospital	Chiang Rai	1994	Public
Ruean Phra Thanesuan (Residence of the Nakhon Pathom Provincial Court Chief Judge)	Nakhon Pathom	1994	Public
Tourism Organization of Thailand 2nd Regional Office, Lower Southern Region	Nakhon Si Thammarat	1994	Public
Phatthalung Governor's Residence	Phatthalung	1994	Public
Chandrakasem National Museum	Phra Nakhon Si Ayutthaya	1994	Public
Uttaradit Cultural Centre	Uttaradit	1994	Public
Sala Chalermkrung Royal Theatre	Bangkok	1994	Commercial
China House, Mandarin Oriental Hotel	Bangkok	1994	Commercial
Centara Grand Beach Resort & Villas Hua Hin	Prachuap Khiri Khan	1994	Commercial
Belgian Ambassador's Residence	Bangkok	1994	Residential
Spa 1930 (Doll House)	Bangkok	1994	Residential
Assumption Cathedral	Bangkok	1994	Religious
Wannasinsamoson, Wat Thepthidaram (Kuti Sunthorn Phu)	Bangkok	1994	Religious
Harris House, Prince Royal's College	Chiang Mai	1996	Public
123 Ban Dee shop	Bangkok	1996	Residential
Jim Thompson House	Bangkok	1996	Residential
Thai Lue House	Chiang Mai	1996	Residential
Tamnak Phet, Wat Bowonniwet Wihan	Bangkok	1996	Religious
Church, Prince Royal's College	Chiang Mai	1996	Religious
Corrections Museum	Bangkok	1997	Public
Cooperative Auditing Department	Bangkok	1997	Public
Ministry of Defence Head Office	Bangkok	1997	Public
Pharotracha House, Chulalongkorn University	Bangkok	1997	Public
Mekhala Ruchi Pavilion, Phaya Thai Palace	Bangkok	1997	Public
Chaleemongkolasana Residence, Sanam Chandra Palace	Nakhon Pathom	1997	Public
Queen Sirikit National Library, Nakhon Phanom Province	Nakhon Phanom	1997	Public
Royal Pavilion, Bang Pa-In Railway Station	Phra Nakhon Si Ayutthaya	1997	Public
Siam Commercial Bank, Lampang Branch (Thai Banking Museum)	Lampang	1997	Commercial
Thai Charoen Gold Shop	Ubon Ratchathani	1997	Commercial
Chao Mae Yodkham House	Lampang	1997	Residential
Abbot's Residence, Wat Si Thep Pradittharam	Nakhon Phanom	1997	Religious
Saeng Tham Shrine (Teng Kong Tong)	Phuket	1997	Religious
Sim, Wat Phra That Choengchum	Sakon Nakhon	1997	Religious
Ordination Hall, Wat Supattanaram	Ubon Ratchathani	1997	Religious
Princess Apphantripacha's Palace (Chart Thai Party Library)	Bangkok	1999	Public
Tuek Yao, Suankularb Wittayalai School	Bangkok	1999	Public
Chiang Mai Hall of Art and Culture	Chiang Mai	1999	Public
Darapirom Palace Museum	Chiang Mai	1999	Public
Khao Nam Chon Headquarter (Chateau Building)	Lop Buri	1999	Public
Former Nonthaburi Provincial Hall	Nonthaburi	1999	Public
Phra Ram Ratchaniwet	Phetchaburi	1999	Public
Aphaiphubet Thai Medical Museum (Chao Phraya Aphaiphubet Building)	Prachin Buri	1999	Public
Ban Phra Athit	Bangkok	1999	Commercial
Tang Toh Kang Gold Shop	Bangkok	1999	Commercial
Santa Cruz Church	Bangkok	1999	Religious
Cathedral of the Immaculate Conception	Chanthaburi	1999	Religious
Wihan Chamathewi, Wat Pong Yang Khok	Lampang	1999	Religious
Wihan Phrachao Pharalakhaeng	Mae Hong Son	1999	Religious
Wat Chontharasinghe	Narathiwat	1999	Religious
Sim, Wat Chakrawan Phumphinit	Roi Et	1999	Religious
Sim, Wat Rasisalai	Roi Et	1999	Religious
Sim, Wat Traiphumkhanachan	Roi Et	1999	Religious
Ho Trai, Wat Sa Trainurak	Yasothon	1999	Religious
Constitutional Court	Bangkok	2001	Public
River Pavilion, Bank of Thailand	Bangkok	2001	Public
Blue Elephant Restaurant (Thai–Chinese Chamber of Commerce)	Bangkok	2001	Public
Siam Society Headquarters	Bangkok	2001	Public
McDonald's, Ratchadamnoen Branch	Bangkok	2001	Commercial
Khun Amphaiphanit Building	Sisaket	2001	Commercial
M.R. Kukrit Pramoj House	Bangkok	2001	Residential
Kuden Mansion, Satun National Museum	Satun	2001	Residential
Ursulin Church and Convent, Mater Dei School	Bangkok	2001	Religious
Wihan Lai Kham, Wat Phra Sing	Chiang Mai	2001	Religious
Sim, Wat Klang Khok Kho	Kalasin	2001	Religious
Sim, Wat Sa Thong	Khon Kaen	2001	Religious
Vihara, Wat Nong Daeng	Nan	2001	Religious
Wat Buppharam (Wat Plai Khlong)	Trat	2001	Religious
Hua Lamphong Railway Station	Bangkok	2002	Public
Chulalongkorn University Auditorium	Bangkok	2002	Public
Glass House, Dusit Zoo	Bangkok	2002	Public
Ban Manangkhasila	Bangkok	2002	Public
Pei-ing School	Bangkok	2002	Public
Ban Phitsanulok (Ban Banthomsin)	Bangkok	2002	Public
Phra Nakhon District Office (Phraya Amaretsombat House)	Bangkok	2002	Public
Wang Suan Ban Kaew, Rambhaibhanni Rajabhat University	Chanthaburi	2002	Public
Phra Phanwassa Building and Seaside House, Queen Savang Vadhana Memorial Hospital	Chon Buri	2002	Public
Tourism Organization of Thailand 7th Regional Office, Central Region	Lop Buri	2002	Public
Former Phra Nakhon Si Ayutthaya Provincial Hall	Phra Nakhon Si Ayutthaya	2002	Public
Mrigadayavan Palace	Prachuap Khiri Khan	2002	Public
Mandarin Oriental Hotel	Bangkok	2002	Commercial
Ruam Suk House	Prachuap Khiri Khan	2002	Residential
Wat Suan Phlu	Bangkok	2002	Religious
Sim, Wat Pho Si	Khon Kaen	2002	Religious
Wat Phra That Lampang Luang	Lampang	2002	Religious
Vihara, Wat Phumin	Nan	2002	Religious
Wat Amphawan Chetiyaram	Samut Songkhram	2002	Religious
Abbot Residence, Wat Thai Yo	Songkhla	2002	Religious
Building No. 4, Bank of Thailand (Tuek Mom Lamai)	Bangkok	2004	Public
Tea House Siam Celadon	Chiang Mai	2004	Commercial
Udomphan Shop	Kanchanaburi	2004	Commercial
Ban Issarasena	Bangkok	2004	Residential
Suriyasai House	Bangkok	2004	Residential
Tamnak Phra Chao Suea (Golden Pavilion), Wat Sai	Bangkok	2004	Religious
First Presbyterian Church, Samray	Bangkok	2004	Religious
Ho Trai Nong Khulu	Ubon Ratchathani	2004	Religious
Dome Building, Thammasat University	Bangkok	2005	Public
Narisamoson and Saeng Athit Buildings, Government House	Bangkok	2005	Public
Main Residential Hall, Thewawet Palace	Bangkok	2005	Public
Office of the Crown Property Bureau (Government Hall of Monthon Prachin)	Chachoengsao	2005	Public
Khum Chao Burirat (Maha In)	Chiang Mai	2005	Public
Chuthathut Ratchathan Museum, Si Chang Island (Wattana Hall, Phongsi Hall, Aphirom Hall, Wooden Seaside Pavilion)	Chon Buri	2005	Public
Office of King Narai National Museum	Lop Buri	2005	Public
Pattani Governor's Residence	Pattani	2005	Public
Ban Bayan (Bayan Company Limited)	Prachuap Khiri Khan	2005	Public
Permanent Exhibition Hall, Ratchaburi National Museum (Former Provincial Hall)	Ratchaburi	2005	Public
Kraichitti Art Gallery (Ban Kraichitti)	Bangkok	2005	Residential
Sao Nak House	Lampang	2005	Residential
Sinanon House	Lampang	2005	Residential
Khru Montri Tramot's House (Som Song Saeng House)	Nonthaburi	2005	Residential
Vihara, Wat Manophirom	Mukdahan	2005	Religious
Taloh Manoh Mosque (Wadi Al Hussein Mosque)	Narathiwat	2005	Religious
Krue Se Mosque	Pattani	2005	Religious
Saint Joseph's Church	Phra Nakhon Si Ayutthaya	2005	Religious
National Discovery Museum Institute (Former Office of the Ministry of Commerce)	Bangkok	2006	Public
Nonthee House (Ban Phibuntham)	Bangkok	2006	Public
British Club	Bangkok	2006	Public
Makkasan Train Warehouse	Bangkok	2006	Public
Siriraj Hospital (Royal Medical College Auditorium and Riverside Pavilion)	Bangkok	2006	Public
Tuek Daeng, (Office of the State Railway of Thailand, Yotse)	Bangkok	2006	Public
Chiang Mai Railway Station	Chiang Mai	2006	Public
Prince Royal's College	Chiang Mai	2006	Public
Chuan Rai Phrom Daen Museum (Former Governor's Residence)	Rayong	2006	Public
Phathammarong Museum (Jail Warden Museum)	Songkhla	2006	Public
Chiang Mai British Council	Chiang Mai	2006	Residential
Monks' Residence, Wat Khuan Nai	Pattani	2006	Religious
Ubosot, Wat Phra Haruethai (Wat Phleng)	Ratchaburi	2006	Religious
Wat Sisuriyawongsaram	Ratchaburi	2006	Religious
Wat Suwankhiri, Wat Bo Sap, Wat Siriwannawat, and Wat Phu Pha Boek	Songkhla	2006	Religious
53rd Public Health Service Centre, Thung Song Hong	Bangkok	2007	Public
Lumphini Park Discovery Learning Library	Bangkok	2007	Public
Prince Svasti Sobhon's Palace (UNICEF Office for Thailand)	Bangkok	2007	Public
Prasanmit Building, Srinakharinwirot University	Bangkok	2007	Public
Study Hall, Assumption Convent School	Bangkok	2007	Public
Maen Naruemit Building, Debsirin School	Bangkok	2007	Public
Thaworawatthu Building	Bangkok	2007	Public
Phrom Panya Library, Nan Provincial Prison	Nan	2007	Public
Songkhla National Museum	Songkhla	2007	Public
Thai Phuan House, Ban Chiang	Udon Thani	2007	Public
Siam Commercial Bank, Chaloem Nakhon Branch	Bangkok	2007	Commercial
Ruean Rarin Chinda	Chiang Mai	2007	Commercial
No. 19, South Sathon Road	Bangkok	2007	Residential
Pa Buala Chaichit's House	Lamphun	2007	Residential
Hok Sae Tueng	Uthai Thani	2007	Residential
Vihara, Wat Ratchabophit Sathitmahasimaram	Bangkok	2007	Religious
Chapel, Saint Joseph Convent School	Bangkok	2007	Religious
Loha Prasat, Wat Ratchanaddaram	Bangkok	2007	Religious
Wat Lai Hin	Lampang	2007	Religious
Vihara, Wat Rong Ngae	Nan	2007	Religious
Paulinian Brain-Based Learning Center, Santa Cruz Convent School	Bangkok	2008	Public
Wang Varichwes	Bangkok	2008	Public
Chao Ratchasumpan Residence	Lamphun	2008	Public
Administration Building of Ananda Mahidol Hospital	Lop Buri	2008	Public
Phuket Thaihua Museum	Phuket	2008	Public
Trat Museum (The Old City Hall)	Trat	2008	Public
Nine-Roomed Row Building on Phra Athit Road	Bangkok	2008	Commercial
"Tawin" Shop	Chiang Mai	2008	Commercial
Fong-Lee Building	Lampang	2008	Commercial
China Inn Cafe & Restaurant	Phuket	2008	Commercial
Bangkok Folk Museum	Bangkok	2008	Residential
Thai Traditional Music House, Luang Pradit Phairoh Foundation	Bangkok	2008	Residential
Vihara, Wat Makutkasattriyaram	Bangkok	2008	Religious
Kian Un Keng Shrine	Bangkok	2008	Religious
Ho Trai, Wat Aunluay	Chiang Mai	2008	Religious
Vihara and Ho Trai, Wat Duang Dee	Chiang Mai	2008	Religious
Vihara, Wat Pantao	Chiang Mai	2008	Religious
Vihara, Wat Ban Kao	Lampang	2008	Religious
Supreme Court (demolished in 2012)	Bangkok	2009	Public
Chiang Mai Philatelic Museum	Chiang Mai	2009	Public
Wat Lanka School	Suphanburi	2009	Public
Wang Daeng Hall of History, Udon Thani Rajabhat University	Udon Thani	2009	Public
Baan Dinso Boutique Hostel	Bangkok	2009	Commercial
Old Row Houses, No. 158–162 Charoen Mueang Road	Chiang Mai	2009	Commercial
U Hotel Chiang Mai	Chiang Mai	2009	Commercial
Prince Rangsit's Palace (Vidyu Palace)	Bangkok	2009	Residential
Chinpracha Mansion	Phuket	2009	Residential
Wat Bot Samsen	Bangkok	2009	Religious
Phra That Doi Tung	Chiang Rai	2009	Religious
Wat Sam Kaeo	Chumphon	2009	Religious
Viharn Phra Chao Pun Ong, Wat Pong Sanuk	Lampang	2009	Religious
Ho Tham, Wat Dong Ruesi	Lamphun	2009	Religious
Ho Tham, Wat Pratu Pa	Lamphun	2009	Religious
Wat Pa Puai	Lamphun	2009	Religious
Ubosot and Ho Trai, Wat Na Phra That	Nakhon Ratchasima	2009	Religious
Wat Sing	Pathum Thani	2009	Religious
Ubosot, Wat Sanam Chai	Songkhla	2009	Religious
Suan Mokkhabalarama	Surat Thani	2009	Religious
Trang Church	Trang	2009	Religious
Baan Pra Nond Bed & Breakfast	Bangkok	2010	Public
Chulalongkorn University Alumni Association Headquarters	Bangkok	2010	Public
Khunluang Rithnarongron House Meseum	Bangkok	2010	Public
Tuek Klom (Round Building), Mahidol University	Bangkok	2010	Public
The Bhuthorn hotel	Bangkok	2010	Public
Former Chiang Rai Provincial Hall	Chiang Rai	2010	Public
Chiang Rai Tobacco Office	Chiang Rai	2010	Public
Chiang Rai Witthayakhom School	Chiang Rai	2010	Public
Phuket Philatelic Museum	Phuket	2010	Public
Sawan Osot Shop	Samut Songkhram	2010	Public
Mueang Chaloem Phra Kiat Museum	Tak	2010	Public
Ban Silpin (Khlong Bang Luang Artist House)	Bangkok	2010	Residential
Chiang Rai Governor's Residence	Chiang Rai	2010	Residential
No. 53 Tha Kwan	Phayao	2010	Residential
Phisitkul House	Phayao	2010	Residential
Sutthaphakti House	Phayao	2010	Residential
Phra Phisai Sapphakit Mansion	Phuket	2010	Residential
Ban Noi, Hua Hin	Prachuap Khiri Khan	2010	Residential
Phra Borommathat Maha Chedi (Great Pagoda), Wat Prayurawongsawas	Bangkok	2010	Religious
Wat Si Luang Chae Son	Lampang	2010	Religious
Wat Don Mun	Nan	2010	Religious
Wat Nong Bua	Nan	2010	Religious
Wat Ton Laeng	Nan	2010	Religious
Wat Chom Sawan	Phrae	2010	Religious
Phraya Si Thammathirat Residence	Bangkok	2014	Public
Royal Thai Dockyard Museum	Bangkok	2014	Public
Thai Waterworks Museum	Bangkok	2014	Public
Thamniap Tha Chang Building	Bangkok	2014	Public
Laem Thaen Reception House	Chon Buri	2014	Public
Thai Ambassador's residence, Yangon	N/A	2014	Public
Building 6, Farm Mechanics Department, Faculty of Engineering and Architecture, Rajamangala University of Technology Isan	Nakhon Ratchasima	2014	Public
Nan Christian Suksa School	Nan	2014	Public
Building 1, Wat Phra Borommathat Chaiya School	Surat Thani	2014	Public
Bumrungchat Sassana Yathai (Ban Mo Wann)	Bangkok	2014	Commercial
Villa, Bang Saen Heritage Hotel	Chon Buri	2014	Commercial
Hua Hong House	Kanchanaburi	2014	Commercial
Ban Si Burapha	Bangkok	2014	Residential
Ban Nong Bua	Chanthaburi	2014	Residential
Bhuddavas section, Wat Benchamabophi Dusitvanaram	Bangkok	2014	Religious
Sefi Mosque	Bangkok	2014	Religious
Ubosot, Wat Khruea Wan	Bangkok	2014	Religious
Wat Tha Riap	Buriram	2014	Religious
Yanwitchayonuson Residence, Wat Phanit Sitthikaram	Lamphun	2014	Religious
Sim, Ho Chaek & painted residence, Wat Rat Pradit	Ubon Ratchathani	2014	Religious
Kuru Sammanakarn, Rajamangala University of Technology Isan	Nakhon Ratchasima	2015	Public
Ruan Morphon Museum, Rajamangala University of Technology Phra Nakhon	Bangkok	2015	Public
Ban Luang Rajamaitri Historic Inn	Chanthaburi	2015	Commercial
Ruean Prasenchit	Nakhon Ratchasima	2015	Residential
Ban Pluk Predee	Bangkok	2015	Residential
Mrs. Peu's house (Ruean Khorat), Jom Thompson Farm	Nakhon Ratchasima	2015	Residential
Phra Ariyawongsachan's residence (Kuti Daeng), Wat Mani Wanaram	Ubon Ratchathani	2015	Religious
Folk ordination hall, Wat Borommakhongkha	Buriram	2015	Religious
Chapel, Chiang Mai Christian School	Chiang Mai	2015	Religious
Bl. Nicholas Bunkerd Kitbamrung's residence	Nakhon Ratchasima	2015	Religious
Buddhavas section, Wat Borommaniwat	Bangkok	2015	Religious

=== Vernacular communities ===
Name	Province	Year
Row Houses on Phra Athit Road	Bangkok	2001
Pak Kran Community	Phra Nakhon Si Ayutthaya	2001
Amphawa Community	Samut Songkhram	2002
Khlong Suan Community, 100-Year Market	Samut Prakan	2004
Wat Ket Community	Chiang Mai	2005
Sapha Kafae Ban Khun Nakhon (Khun Nakhon Coffee Club) 2435 B.E.	Nakhon Si Thammarat	2005
Talad Bang Phli Yai Community	Samut Prakan	2005
Ban Saphan Bang Pla Soi Community: Soi Khu Kamphon, Soi Kon Pom Khai, Soi Bai Phon Nam, Soi Samranrat, Soi Chatdecha, and Soi Tha Ruea Phli	Chon Buri	2006
Ban Na O Community	Loei	2006
Lat Chado Community	Phra Nakhon Si Ayutthaya	2006
Talad Rahaeng Community	Pathum Thani	2007
Guardguongta Community, Lampang	Lampang	2008
The Ancient Community of Yomjinda Road, Rayong	Rayong	2008
Ban Ton Haen Noi–Ton Haen Luang Community	Chiang Mai	2009
Saint Paul Church Community	Chachoengsao	2010
Ban Pa Daet Community	Chiang Mai	2010
Ban Phut En Community	Chiang Mai	2010
Ban Thong Fai Community	Chiang Mai	2010
Chiang Khan Community	Loei	2010
Trok Ban Chin	Tak	2010

=== Buildings worthy of conservation ===
Name	Province	Year
Chai Asavaraks Building, Faculty of Veterinary Medicine, Chulalongkorn University	Bangkok	2015
New Pavilion, Suan Amporn	Bangkok	2015
Srifuengfung Building	Bangkok	2015
Luang Thanin Pathomrat residence	Bangkok	2015
Land raft houses (ruean phae pok), Tha Khanon Subdistrict	Surat Thani	2015
Ho Trai, Wat Lam Chang	Chiang Mai	2015
Royal Bangkok Sports Club	Bangkok	2015
Sala kan parian, Wat Tha Kham	Bangkok	2015
Ruean Luang Residence, Wat Sam Khok	Pathum Thani	2015
Sangkapricha Family ancestral house	Chachoengsao	2015

== See also ==
- Architecture of Thailand
- Cultural heritage conservation in Thailand
