= Wat Lam Chang =

Buddhist temple in Chiang Mai, Thailand

Coordinates: 18°47′35″N 98°59′26″E

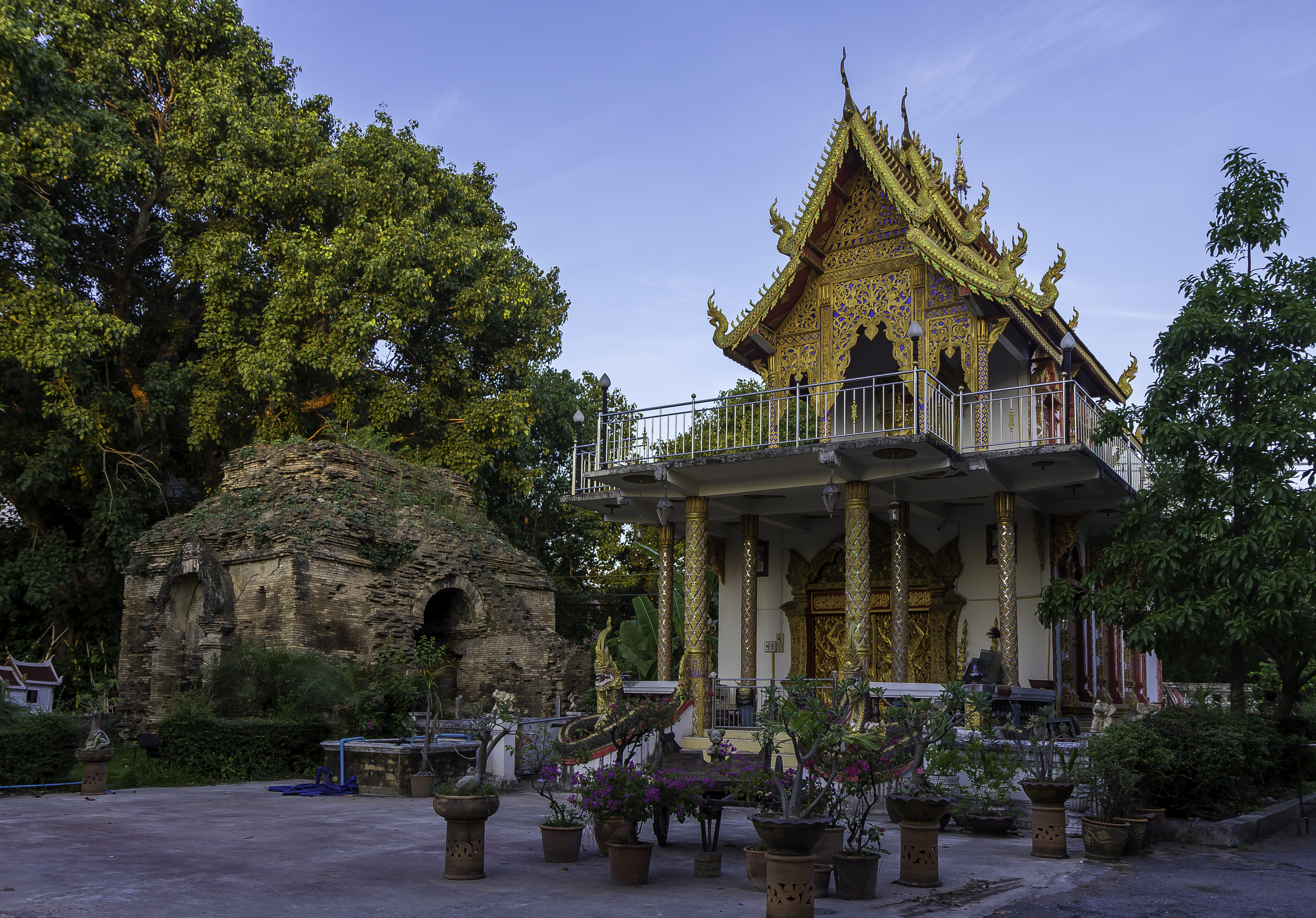

Religion
- Affiliation: Buddhism
- Sect: Therevada Buddhism

Location
- Location: 32 Moonmuang Road Soi 7, Tambon Si Phum, Mueang Chiang Mai district, Chiang Mai
- Country: Thailand
- Interactive map of Wat Lam Chang

Architecture
- Founder: King Mangrai
- Established: c. 1300

Wat Lam Chang is a Buddhist temple in Chiang Mai, northern Thailand. Situated in the old city, the temple was established at the beginning of the 14th century by King Mangrai, the first king of Lan Na (1296–1311) and founder of Chiang Mai.

== History ==
A temple was known to have been constructed on the site during the 1300s by King Mangrai which later became known as Wat Lam Chang, meaning 'temple of the shackled elephants', referring to the location where elephants belonging to the royal household were kept. The current buildings are of recent construction although the remains of a chedi situated within the grounds is much older.

== Description ==
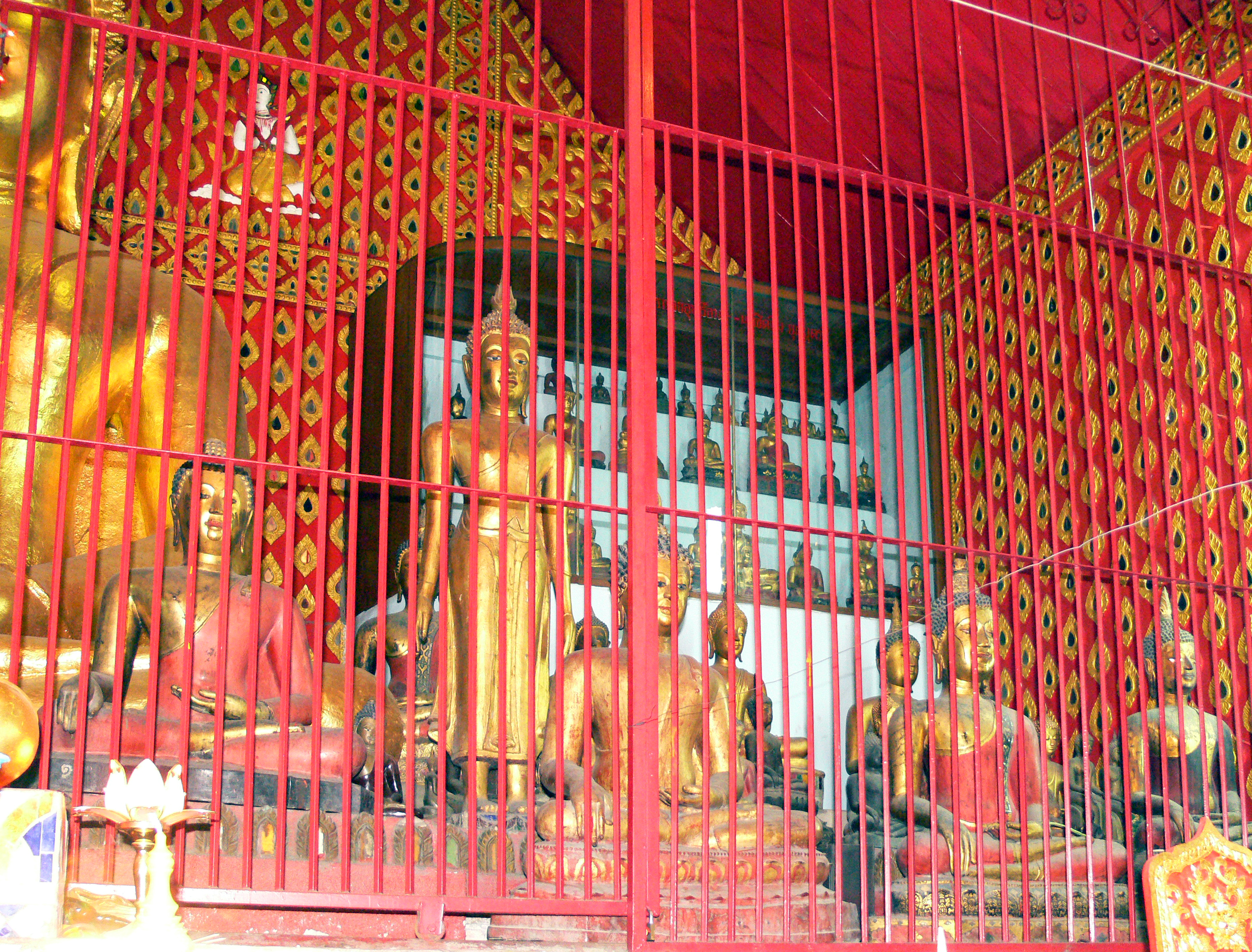
Buddha images, kept behind a large iron grill

Wat Lam Chang consists of a viharn built in the Lan Na style, with separate entrances for monks and worshippers in accordance with Lan Na tradition; an ubosot; a scripture depository; and two chedis–a Burmese style round chedi with elephants placed around its base and decorated with Thepphanom figures, and an old chedi with a square-shaped base made of brick and much dilapidated. Within the grounds are numerous statues of elephants.

The temple is known for its large collection of historical Buddha images which is kept in the viharn behind a large iron grill. Amounting to around 200 images, they have come from former temples in Chiang Mai's old city which have since disappeared.
