= Rop Wiang =

Rop Wiang รอบเวียง
- Subdistrict
- Interactive map of Rop Wiang
- Country: Thailand
- Province: Chiang Rai
- District: Mueang Chiang Rai

Population (2005)
  - Total: 47,992
- Time zone: UTC+7 (ICT)

Rop Wiang (Thai: รอบเวียง) is a tambon (subdistrict) of Mueang Chiang Rai District, in Chiang Rai Province, Thailand. In 2005, it had a population of 47,992 people. The tambon has seven villages.

== Temple ==
- Wat Phra That Doi Khao Kwai
