= Sihuhata =

Lanna legendary creature

A charcoal-burning stove and offerings for Sihuhata at Wat Phra That Doi Khao Kwai, Chiang Rai province

Sihuhata (Thai: แมงสี่หูห้าตา, Maeng Sihuhata, lit. 'four ears, five eyes') is a legendary creature in Lanna folklore of northern Thailand. It is described as a large animal with four ears and five eyes. In one Lanna manuscript, it resembles a bear, eats burning charcoal and produces gold as excrement. The creature also appears in local traditions about Wat Phra That Doi Khao Kwai in Chiang Rai province. In another version of the story, Sihuhata is Indra, who takes the form of the creature to test a person's virtue.

== Legend ==
The story is recorded in a Lanna palm-leaf manuscript called Tham Sihuhata (ธัมม์สี่หูห้าตา) from Wat Chae Chang in San Kamphaeng district, Chiang Mai. The manuscript has 61 palm-leaf pages. It was written in Lanna script by Phimmasan Bhikkhu in 1914.

The story takes place in the kingdom of Phanthumati, ruled by King Phanthumati, who has seven wives. A poor couple live north of the city with their son. His mother dies when he is seven years old, followed by his father when he is eleven. Before his death, the father tells his son to bury his body near their home. He tells the boy to worship his skull when it becomes separated from the body. At the age of 16, the boy must drag the skull towards Phanthumati and set an animal trap wherever it becomes stuck.

When the boy reaches a mountain near the city, the skull becomes stuck at the entrance of a cave. He sets a trap there and returns the next morning. The trap has caught a large animal resembling a bear, with four ears and five eyes. He takes the creature home and tries to feed it grass and leaves, but it refuses to eat. One night, a burning coal falls from a fire and the creature eats it. The boy then feeds it more charcoal. The next morning, he finds that the creature has produced gold as excrement.

The boy continues feeding the creature charcoal and secretly buries the gold. Meanwhile, King Phanthumati has a daughter named Simma. The king announces that whoever can build a golden water channel from his own city to the princess's palace may marry her. The poor boy hires a group of Chinese merchants to build a channel from his home to the palace. They complete it in one night. The boy then marries Princess Simma and becomes the king's son-in-law.

The king asks how his son-in-law obtained so much gold. After hearing about Sihuhata, he orders his officials to collect the gold and asks the young man to bring him the creature. When Sihuhata is led through the city, the crowds frighten it and it escapes to the cave. The king follows the creature into the cave, but falling rocks block the entrance and trap him inside.

The king remains trapped for several days. He calls for his seven wives and asks each one to expose herself to him before he dies. The first six refuse, but the seventh agrees. The rock blocking the entrance begins to laugh and breaks open, allowing the king to escape.

The king returns to the city and gives the kingdom to his son-in-law. The new king follows Buddhist teachings and builds six places where the poor can receive donations. The story explains the belief that men love their younger wives more than their first wives. The cave becomes known as Tham Yub.

=== Indra tradition ===
Statue of Sihuhata.

Another version of the legend identifies Sihuhata with Indra. In this version, the creature resembles a monkey rather than a bear. A study of the Karen community at Huai Tom records a story in which Indra sees a poor orphan and decides to help him. He takes the form of Sihuhata and comes to earth. The creature eats burning embers and produces gold, making the orphan wealthy.

A similar belief is found in stories about Sihuhata at Wat Phra That Doi Khao Kwai in Chiang Rai, where the creature is also described as a form of Indra.

== Religious interpretation ==
The four ears and five eyes have Buddhist meanings in some northern Thai traditions. The four ears represent the four Brahmavihāras, while the five eyes represent the Five Precepts. This explanation was given by Khruba Chaiyawongsa Phatthana.

The Chiang Mai University account suggests that the story may have begun as a local oral tale called jia before being written as a religious story. It describes the written version as a non-canonical Jataka tale.

== Cultural representations ==
Statues of Sihuhata have been made in several places in northern Thailand. Wat Phra That Doi Khao Kwai in Chiang Rai has statues of the creature.

Sihuhata figures are also used as objects of worship and as amulets. Some people believe they bring good fortune and wealth because the creature produces gold in the legend.

Sihuhata was also used as the mascot of the 2018 National Games in Chiang Rai, known as the Chiang Rai Games.
