= Abhayavongsa family =

Thai family

House of Abhayavongsa อภัยวงศ์
- Country: Siam
- Current region: Prachinburi
- Origin: Cambodia
- Founded: 1795
- Founder: Chaophraya Aphaiphubet (Baen)
- Final ruler: Chaophraya Aphaiphubet (Chum Aphaiwong)
- Titles: Governor of Phra Tabong (1794–1907); Prime minister of Thailand (1944–1945, 1946, 1947–1948)
- Connected families: House of Chakri; House of Varman; House of Bunnag; Sinhaseni family Kanlayanamit family Sukhum family

Abhayavongsa (Thai: อภัยวงศ์; RTGS: Aphaiwong) is a Thai noble surname used by a Thai family that formerly governed parts of Cambodia which was then ruled by Siam. Despite its long presence in Cambodia, it was never considered part of the Khmer nobility.

The Abhayavongsa family governed Phra Tabong Province, Thailand (modern Battambang Province, Cambodia) for six generations from the late 18th century, when Siam annexed the Khmer territories, until 1907, when the area was ceded to French Indochina effectively reuniting it with Cambodia. The title bestowed by the Thai King to the governor of Phra Tabong which was used by each successive governor was Aphaiphubet.

In later years, the Abhayavongsa family played important roles in the anti-French struggle for Cambodian independence and one descendant became Prime Minister of Thailand. During World War II, Thailand regained control of the western Khmer provinces through Japanese mediation. Khuang Abhayavongsa was elected Prime Minister of Thailand, an office which he held three separate times between August 1944 and April 1948. Through family business ties, Khuang maintained close ties with the western Cambodian provinces during his time in office and fought, to no avail, to keep them under Thai rule in the wake of the Japanese loss and resurgence of the French in Indochina. His brother Chaowalit Aphaiwong worked until 1946 in a "Special Commission" in Battambang and was considered the "Nominal Head of the Khmer Issarak movement" fighting French rule of Cambodia. The official head of the Khmer Issarak movement was Phiset Phanit (Pokhun), Khuang's brother-in-law. A French report of the era went so far as to claim "[t]he Khmer Issarak movement is both a political and commercial affair of the Aphaiwong family". Thus, in the late 1940's, the Khmer nationalist Bun Chanmol married a princess of the House of Abhaiwongse.

== Family members ==
Members of the Abhayavongsa family include:

- Chaophraya Aphaiphubet (Baen): first governor of Phra Tabong (r.1794-1810) and originator of the family surname.
- Phraya Aphaiphubet (Baen): second governor of Phra Tabong (r.1810-1814)
- Phraya Aphaiphubet (Ros): third governor of Phra Tabong (r.1814-1827)
- Phraya Aphaiphubet (Ched): fourth governor of Phra Tabong (r.1827-1835)
- Phraya Aphaiphubet (Som): sixth governor of Phra Tabong (r.1839-1840 or 1848?)
- Phraya Aphaiphubet (Nong): seventh governor of Phra Tabong (r.1848-1860)
- Chaophraya Kathathonthoranin (Yia Aphaiwong): eighth governor of Phra Tabong (r.1860-1892)
- Chaophraya Aphaiphubet (Chum Aphaiwong): ninth governor of Phra Tabong (r.1892-1907)
- phraya Aphaiphubet (Lueam Aphaiwong)
- Princess Suvadhana, princess consort of King Vajiravudh (Rama VI) of Siam. She was a cousin of King Norodom Sihanouk of Cambodia.
- Khuang Abhayavongsa, three-time prime minister of Thailand in the 1940s. Born in Phra Tabong, his father was the last of the Siamese governors of Phra Tabong.
- Chitsen Abhayavongsa, prominent architect with close ties to Khana Ratsadon.
- Pita Limjaroenrat, former leader of the Future Forward Party, descends from the noble family matrilineally but does not claim descent.
