= Wat Phra That Doi Khao Kwai =

Coordinates: 19.8811°N 99.8097°E

- วัดพระธาตุดอยเขาควายแก้ว
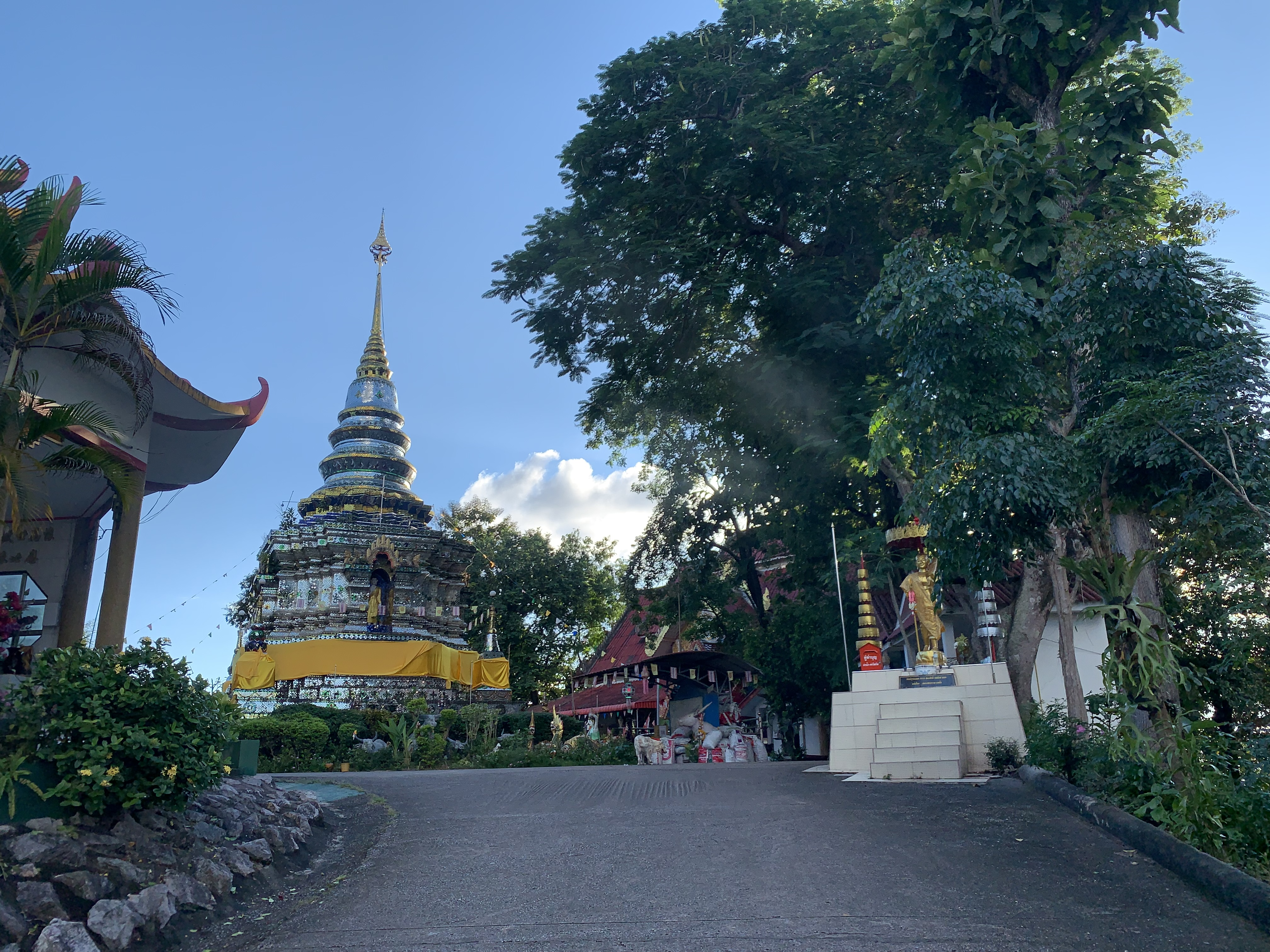
- The stupa of the temple in October 2021

Religion
- Affiliation: Buddhism
- District: Rop Wiang subdistrict, Mueang Chiang Rai District
- Province: Chiang Rai

Location
- Country: Thailand
- Interactive map of Wat Phra That Doi Khao Kwai

Wat Phra That Doi Khao Kwai (Thai: วัดพระธาตุดอยเขาควายแก้ว) is a Buddhist temple in the Rop Wiang subdistrict, Mueang Chiang Rai District, Chiang Rai Province, Thailand. Situated on Doi Khao Khwai Kaeo, southwest of the city center, the temple is believed to enshrine a sacred relic: a bone from the left wrist of the Buddha and its association with mythical beings.

== History ==
According to temple records, the temple is said to be more than 1,000 years old and was founded by the ruler of Chiang Rai, Dhammikaraja. He enshrined a sacred relic of the Buddha, said to be a bone from the left wrist, which had been brought by monks who came to spread Buddhism in the Lanna region. The temple was later restored several times, including during the Chiang Saen period and during the reign of King Mangrai the Great.

In the early 2000s, Chiang Rai Municipality received funding from the Ministry of the Interior to develop the site for visitors. The project included the construction of a viewing platform, walkways, and a parking area.

Wat Phra That Doi Khao Khwai Kaeo is the only temple in Thailand linked with two mythical beings: Khwai Phueak Khao Kaeo (ควายเผือกเขาแก้ว, lit. "Crystal-Horned White Buffalo") and Sihuhata, the "Four-Eared, Five-Eyed" creature.

According to local tradition, a white buffalo is said to have lived in the area in ancient times. The animal's horns were believed to shine like crystal, and it was regarded as sacred. The buffalo was said to have great strength and intelligence and eventually became the leader of a herd. After a long time, villagers discovered the buffalo's horns, which were said to resemble crystal or glass. This discovery led to the mountain being called "Doi Khao Khwai Kaeo", meaning "Mountain of the Crystal Buffalo Horn". According to tradition, the horns of this buffalo, together with a relic of the Buddha, are enshrined in the temple's main chedi.

Another local tradition states that Sihuhata once lived in a cave in the Doi Khao Khwai area. The creature is described as resembling a bear with green fur and having four ears and five eyes. In local legend, the creature is described as an avatar of Indra, the king of the gods, and it consumes burning charcoal and excretes pure gold. In Buddhist interpretation, the four ears symbolize the Four Brahmavihara (loving-kindness, compassion, empathetic joy, and equanimity), while the five eyes represent the Five Precepts.
