= Wat Buppharam, Trat =

Buddhist temple in Thailand

Coordinates: 12°14′59.0″N 102°29′39.2″E

Wat Buppharam (Thai: วัดบุปผาราม), or locally known as Wat Plai Khlong (วัดปลายคลอง) is a Buddhist Thai temple in Mahā Nikāya sect, located at Moo 3, Ban Plai Khlong, Tambon Wang Krachae, Amphoe Mueang Trat, Trat Province, regarded as the oldest and most artistic and historical values temple in the province.

The temple dates back to Ayutthaya period built since the King Prasat Thong's reign. Its name means "temple is full of fragrant flowers", because there is a story that when the founder surveyed the place to build the temple. He discovered the upland that was filled with the scent of flowers.

The buildings and structures of Wat Buppharam are architectures in the early Rattanakosin period such as ordination hall, monastery as well as Buddha footprint hall. They can still maintain the condition until present day.

Inside ordination hall features murals mixed between Ayutthaya and Chinese arts.

Wat Buppharam received the ASA Architectural Conservation Award in 2001.
