= Thepphanom =

Thepphanom or thephanom (Thai: เทพนม, pronounced [tʰêppʰa.nōm]) is a Thai term referring to the depiction in paintings or traditional Thai patterns of a devata performing the Añjali Mudrā hand gesture. The term is also the name of moves in muay Thai and traditional Thai dance.

Thephanom also refers to an angel or deity who is a temple protector and guardian. They are often represented as a pair, a brother and a sister, kneeling on both knees with hands at the wai position, praying or offering respect. The Thepanom first came to earth when Buddha reached enlightenment. They became Buddha's protector, then guardian of religious temples and artifacts such as scrolls. The definition of Thepanom was arrived at by reading descriptions of Thepanom statues and communicating with Thai people.
