= Sala Chaloem Thai =

Theatre in Bangkok, Thailand

Coordinates: 13.7556843°N 100.5046892°E

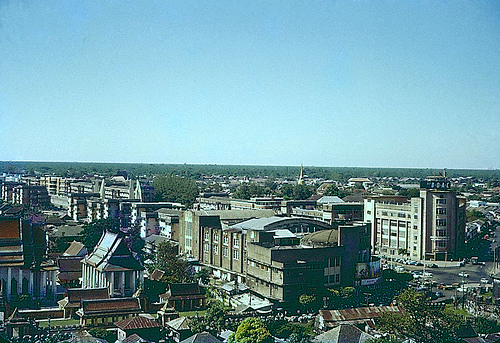
- Sala Chaloem Thai in 1956
- Interactive map of Sala Chaloem Thai
- Address: Phra Nakhon, Bangkok; Thailand
- Type: Theatre

Construction
- Opened: 10 February 1949
- Demolished: 20 March 1989

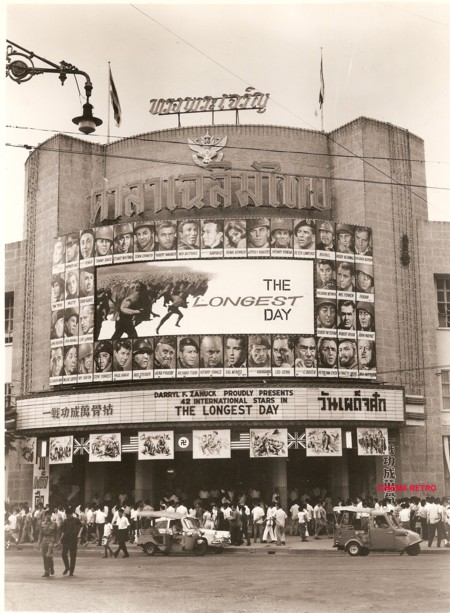
Sala Chaloem Thai while showing The Longest Day (1962)

Sala Chaloem Thai (Thai: ศาลาเฉลิมไทย, pronounced [sǎː.lāː t͡ɕʰā.lɤ̌ːm tʰāj]), abbreviated as Chaloem Thai (เฉลิมไทย), was a movie theatre in Bangkok, located at the corner of Ratchadamnoen Avenue and Mahachai Road near the Fort Mahakan, opposite what is now the Queen Sirikit Gallery.

This movie theatre was built in the year 1940 in the era of Field Marshal Plaek Phibunsongkhram to be another national theatre in Thailand as well as Sala Chalermkrung Royal Theatre in Wang Burapha neighbourhood. The red building's distinctive post-modern architecture was designed to harmonize with the surrounding buildings on Ratchadamnoen Avenue. The official opening ceremony took place on February 10, 1949.

Sala Chaloem Thai was once considered one of the most popular and modern movie theatres. It was dismantled on 20 March 1989 as a result of a cabinet resolution, because it obscured the scenery of Wat Ratchanadda and Loha Prasat. All projectors and seats were handed over to the National Film Archive. The site later became home to a Royal Pavilion Mahajetsadabadin and a memorial to King Rama III.

== See more ==
- Cinema of Thailand
- List of cinemas in Thailand
