= Ko, Lamphun =

Ko, Lamphun ก้อ
- Subdistrict
- Interactive map of Ko, Lamphun
- Coordinates: 17.639401°N 98.785493°E
- Country: Thailand
- Province: Lamphun
- District: Li District

Population (2005)
  - Total: 2,425
- Time zone: UTC+7 (ICT)

Ko, Lamphun (Thai: ก้อ, pronounced [kɔ̂ː]) is a village and tambon (subdistrict) of Li District, in Lamphun Province, Thailand. In 2005 it had a population of 2425 people. The tambon contains four villages.
