= Maha Chulalongkorn and Maha Vajiravudh buildings =

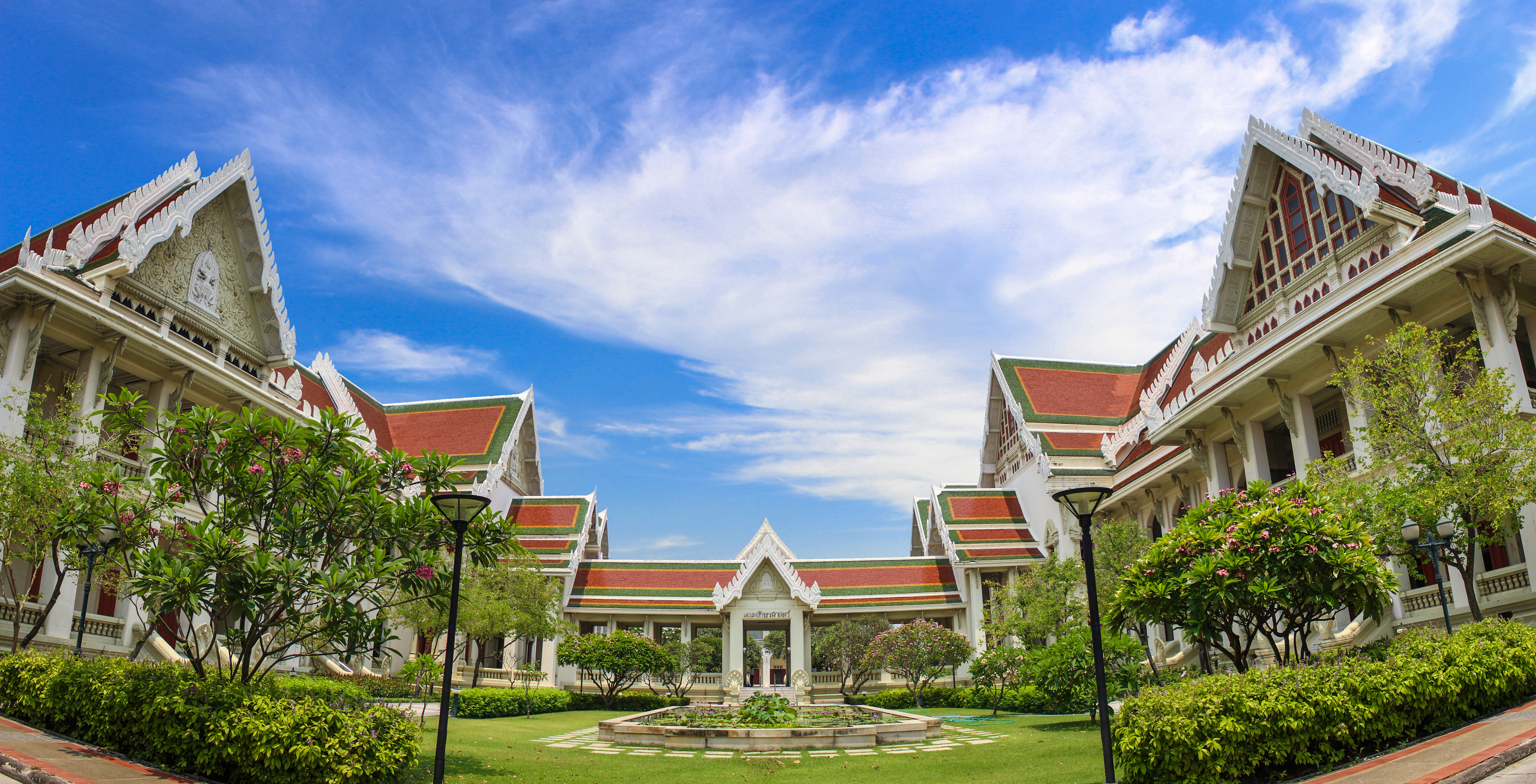
Maha Chulalongkorn Building (left) and Maha Vajiravudh Building (right), viewed from the east

Maha Chulalongkorn Building Main Stair

The Maha Chulalongkorn (Thai: มหาจุฬาลงกรณ์) and Maha Vajiravudh (มหาวชิราวุธ) buildings, also referred to as the Faculty of Arts Buildings, are a pair of historic buildings of Chulalongkorn University. Maha Chulalongkorn Building was originally built as the university's Headquarters or Administrative Building (ตึกบัญชาการ) during 1916–1918, to designs by British architect Edward Healey. Maha Vajiravudh Building was later built from 1953 to 1956. The buildings, for most of their history, housed the university's Faculty of Arts. The buildings are listed as an unregistered ancient monument, and Maha Chulalongkorn Building received the ASA Architectural Conservation Award in 1987.
