= Chulalongkorn University Auditorium =

Buildings in Bangkok, Thailand

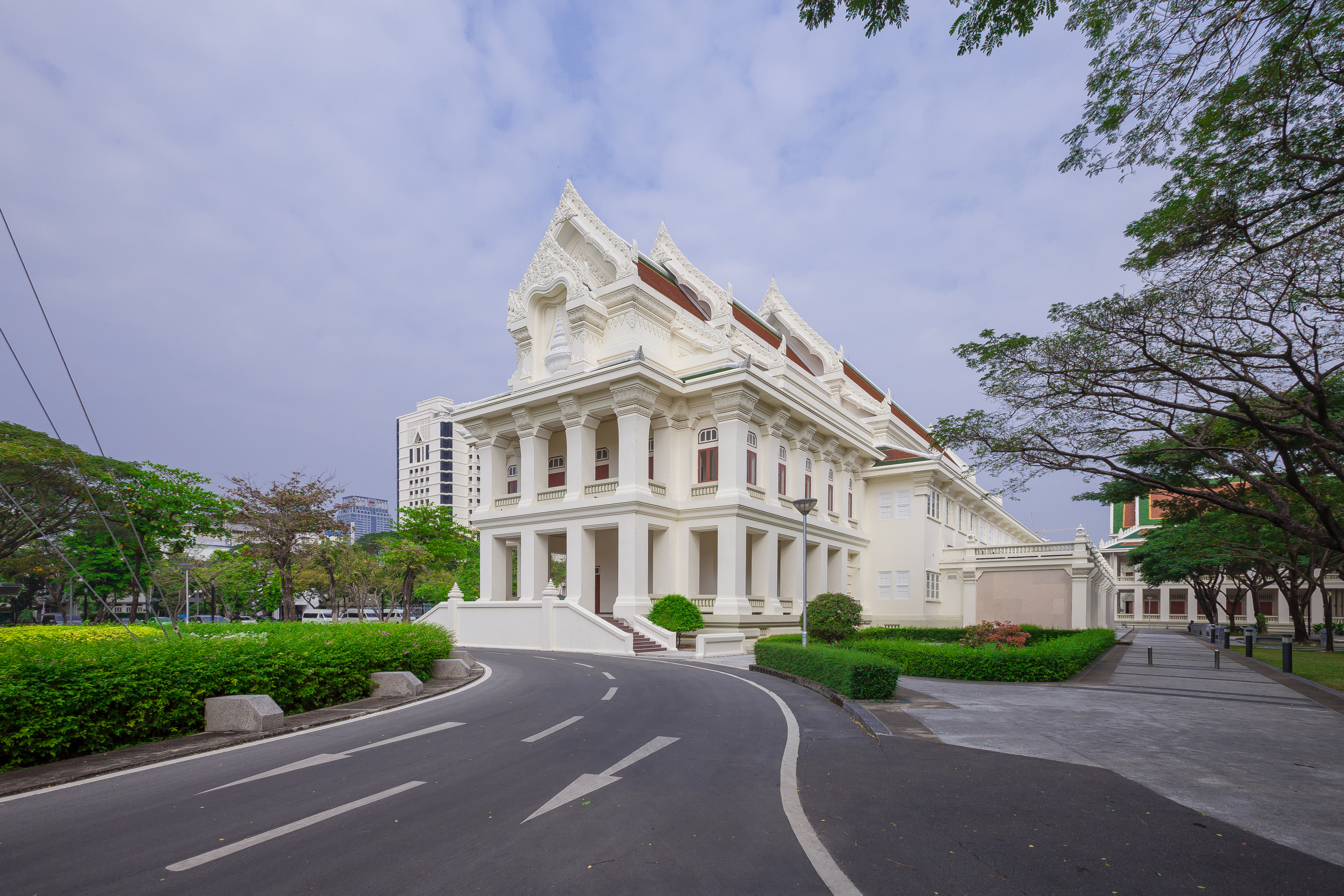
The auditorium, southwest view

The Chulalongkorn University Auditorium is one of the main historic buildings of Chulalongkorn University in Bangkok, Thailand. It was built during 1937–1938 and was designed by Phra Phromphichit (U Laphanon) and Phra Sarotrattananimman (Sarot Sukkhayang). The building represents one of the most major examples in the development of the applied Thai style of architecture during the People's Party government; the modernist reinforced concrete structure is combined with a traditional–Thai/Khmer–influenced layered roof and decorative elements. The building is an unregistered ancient monument, and received the ASA Architectural Conservation Award in 2002.
