= Devavesm Palace =

Palace in Bangkok, Thailand

Coordinates: 13°46′03.9″N 100°29′53.6″E

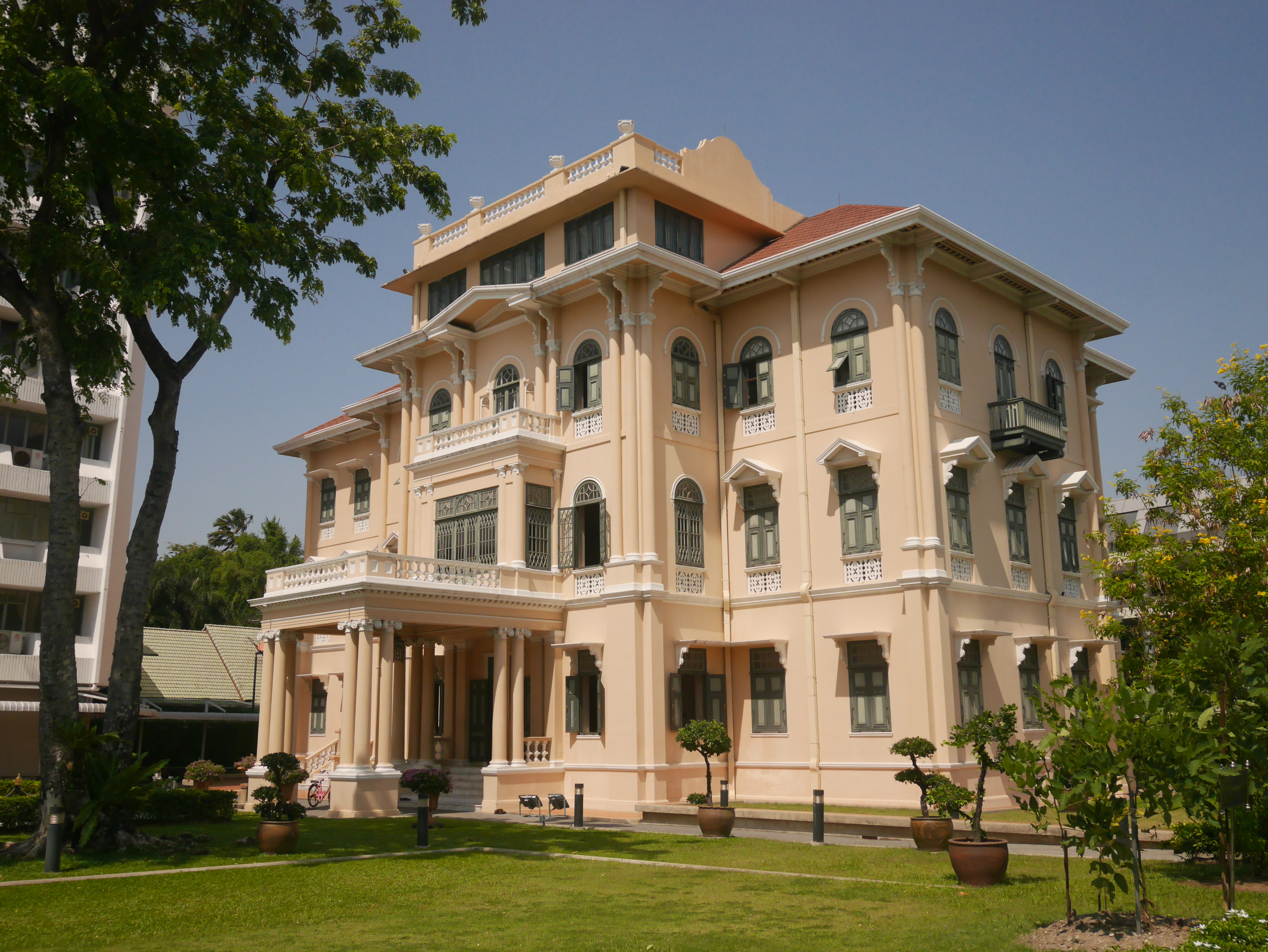
Tamnak Yai, Devavesm Palace

Devavesm Palace (Thai: วังเทวะเวสม์ RTGS: Wang Thewawet [tʰeː.wá.wêːt]) is a former royal residence in Thailand located on the eastern bank of the Chao Phraya river near the counterpart Bang Khun Phrom Palace.

== History ==
The palace was built by King Vajiravudh (Rama VI) for his uncle, Prince Devawongse Varoprakar who is recognized as the father of foreign affairs in Thailand, as his residence in old age. After four years of construction, it was completed in 1918. Standing stylishly in its neoclassical splendour incorporating Greek and Roman architecture to ornament its appearance, Tamnak Yai, the main mansion's design and construction was under the supervision of Edward Healey, a British architect.

Meanwhile, E.G. Gollo, the Italian architect who also supervised the construction of the Ananta Samakhom Throne Hall, saw to the completion of the other seven buildings in the palace complex. Now belonging to the Bank of Thailand, the palace's main mansion had been renovated and as a well-preserved building, it had been turned into the exhibition halls of the Bank of Thailand Museum.

Devavesm Palace had been bought by the Ministry of Public Health in 1950 at the price of ฿4.5 million to be used as an office of the ministry. The elephant statue was built as an imitation of the ones at the Grand Palace. The palace has been owned by the Bank of Thailand since 1987.

In the former days, Devavesm Palace and Bang Khun Phrom Palace were separated by a wall. At the present time, the wall has been removed and the two palaces are owned by the Bank of Thailand.

Additionally, Tamnak Yai was recognized with an Honourable Mention in the 2005 UNESCO Asia-Pacific Awards for Cultural Heritage Conservation.
