= Khruba Chaiyawongsa Phatthana =

Khruba Chaiyawongsa Phatthana (Thai: ครูบาชัยยะวงศาพัฒนา; 22 April 1913 – 17 May 2000), also known as Khruba Wong (Thai: ครูบาวงศ์), was a Thai Buddhist monk from Lamphun province. He was the abbot of Wat Phra Phutthabat Huai Tom in Li district and worked with Karen communities in northern Thailand. His monastic title was Phra Khru Phatthanakitjanurak (Thai: พระครูพัฒนกิจจานุรักษ์).

== Early life ==
Chaiyawongsa was born Wong, also known as Chaiwong Taengam, on 22 April 1913 in Ban Ko, Li district, Lamphun province. His parents were Chanta and Bua Kaeo, and he was the third of eight children. In 1924, his family visited Wat Ko Chok. After hearing a sermon there, his father sent him to live with his uncle, Khruba Chailangka, at Wat Kaeng Soi in Hot district, Chiang Mai province. He first worked there making bricks for the construction of a chedi.

In 1925, he was ordained as a novice at Wat Kaeng Soi under Khruba Chailangka and was given the name Chaiyalangka. He later studied meditation with Khruba Phrommachak of Wat Phra Phutthabat Tak Pha. He accompanied Phrommachak when he taught Buddhist communities in Mae Sariang and learned the Karen language and other languages spoken by hill communities.

In 1932, Chaiyawongsa was ordained as a monk at Wat Pa Mae Kratae Krador under Khruba Phrommachak and received the monastic name Chaiyawongsa.

== Monastic life ==
After his ordination, Chaiyawongsa continued his religious work. He followed a vegetarian diet and the practices of Khruba Siwichai. He also worked with Khruba Siwichai and Khruba Apichai Khao Pi and helped hill communities.

At the age of 22, Chaiyawongsa took part with Karen people in the construction of the road to Wat Phra That Doi Suthep, led by Khruba Siwichai. He later helped Siwichai restore Wat Ban Pang.

Between 1936 and 1940, Chaiyawongsa was forced to leave the monkhood. He wore white robes during this period and became known as Phra Chaiyawong the White-robed. In 1941, he was ordained again at Wat Pa Phlu and received the monastic name Candavaṃso.

Chaiyawongsa later became abbot of Wat Phra Phutthabat Huai Tom in Li district. He worked with local hill communities on religious and community matters and helped disadvantaged people.

== Karen communities ==
Karen followers of Chaiyawongsa settled at Ban Phra Phutthabat Huai Tom. The community database of the Princess Maha Chakri Sirindhorn Anthropology Centre records that some of them followed his practice of vegetarianism.

A study published in 2023 interviewed 36 people in Karen communities about Chaiyawongsa's teachings. It discussed the Five Precepts, occupation, lifestyle and community activities.

== Ecclesiastical titles ==
On 4 April 1971, Chaiyawongsa was appointed Phra Khru Baidika Chaiyawongsa Phatthana. On 5 April 1987, he was appointed Phra Khru Phatthanakitjanurak. On 10 December 1990, he was appointed abbot of Wat Phra Phutthabat Huai Tom. On 5 December 1997, he was appointed Phra Khru Phatthanakitjanurak, a second-rank abbot of a non-royal temple.

== Awards ==
In 1993, Chaiyawongsa received the Khruba Siwichai Award for his work in Buddhist development and public activities. In 1996, he received a certificate of recognition as a good citizen of Thung Hua Chang district. In 1999, he received recognition for outstanding work in art and architecture in Lamphun province and the Sema Dhamma Chakra Award for contributions to community development.

== Death and legacy ==
Chaiyawongsa died on 17 May 2000. His remains are kept at Wat Phra Phutthabat Huai Tom. A ceremony to change the robes covering his remains is held each year.
