= Edward Healey (architect) =

British architect

Edward Healey was a British architect who worked mainly in Siam/Thailand during the first half of the twentieth century. He graduated from the Royal College of Arts in London in 1907, and travelled to Siam, becoming headmaster of the Poh Chang School of Arts and Crafts from 1910 to 1912. He ran a private construction firm, known as Siam Architect, and designed numerous buildings, including Devavesm Palace, the Headquarters Building of Chulalongkorn University, Manangkhasila Mansion, and the main building of the Siam Society.
