= Applied Thai architecture =

Architecture movement

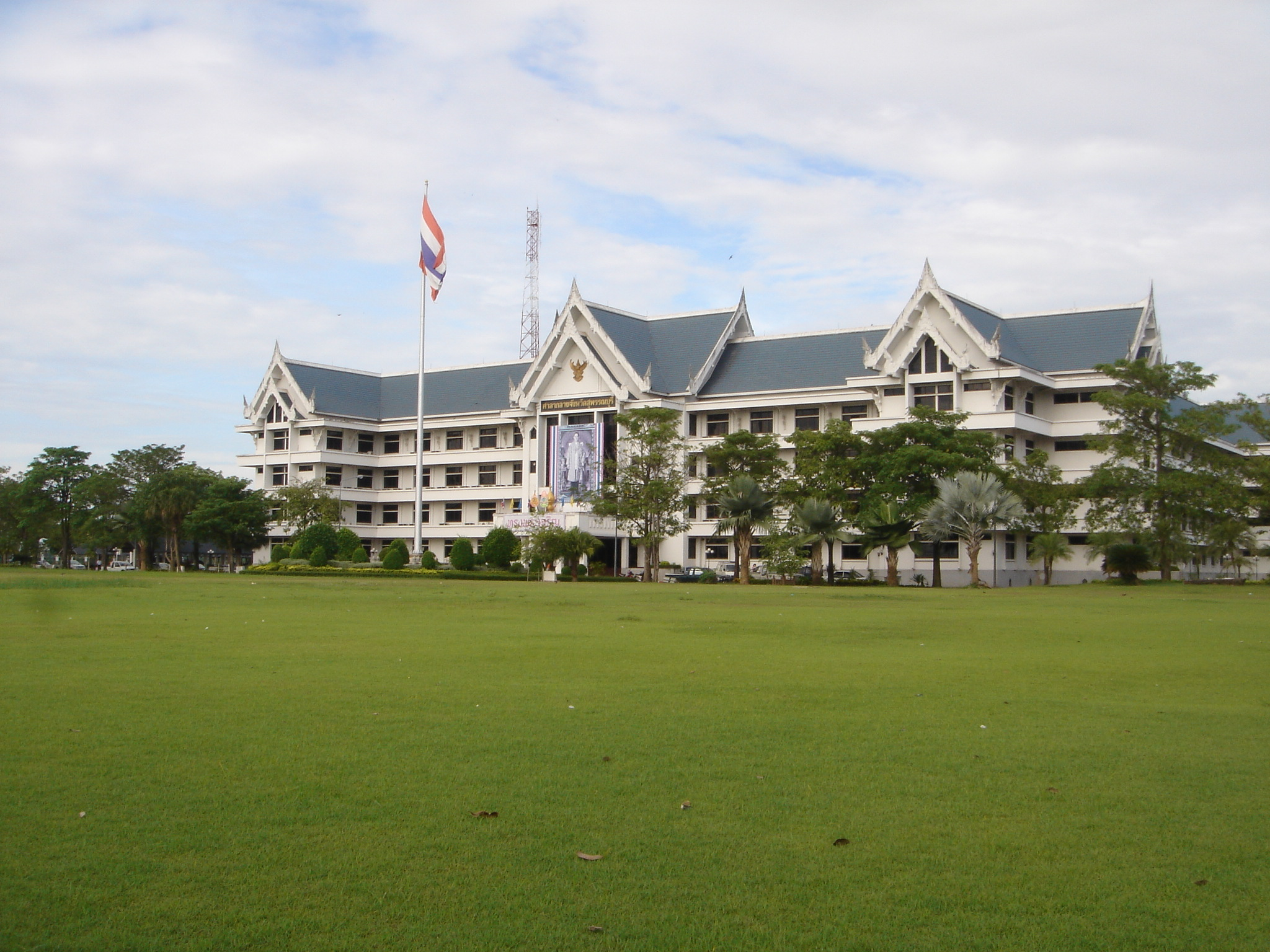
Suphan Buri Provincial Hall, an example of the applied Thai style

Applied Thai architecture is a movement in Thai architecture which gained popularity, especially for government buildings, during the mid-twentieth century. It arose as a way to signify Thainess, as opposed to following Western traditions, during periods of nationalism beginning during the government of Prime Minister Plaek Phibunsongkhram. The style features the incorporation of certain traditional Thai elements into buildings otherwise following modern plans, usually in the form of high-pitched gabled roofs with simplified forms of traditional ornamentation in concrete. The style has been strongly criticized—Anuwit Charoensupkul in 1969 called it the "cancer of architecture"—and mostly rejected by later architects, though it is still employed in the construction of government buildings, mostly provincial halls and courts.
