= Sarot Sukkhayang =

Thai architect

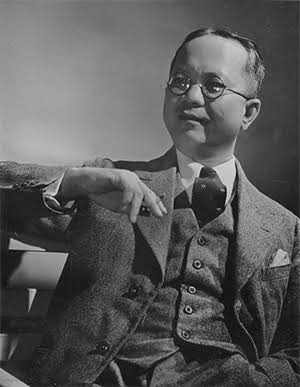
Sarot Sukkhayang

Sarot Sukkhayang (Thai: สาโรช สุขยางค์, also spelled Saroj and Sukhayang/Sukkayang, born Saroj Subhung, 1898–1950), also known by the noble title Phra Sarot Rattananimman (พระสาโรชรัตนนิมมานก์), was a Thai architect who designed many public buildings in the first half of the twentieth century. He was among the first Thais to receive formal architecture education in Europe, graduating from the University of Liverpool in 1920, and served as Director of the Architecture Division of the Fine Arts Department. Among his contributions are several buildings at Siriraj Hospital and Chulalongkorn University, including the university's main auditorium.
