= Maha Phruettharam subdistrict =

Coordinates: 13°44′07.8″N 100°31′18.1″E

Maha Phruettharam มหาพฤฒาราม
- Khwaeng
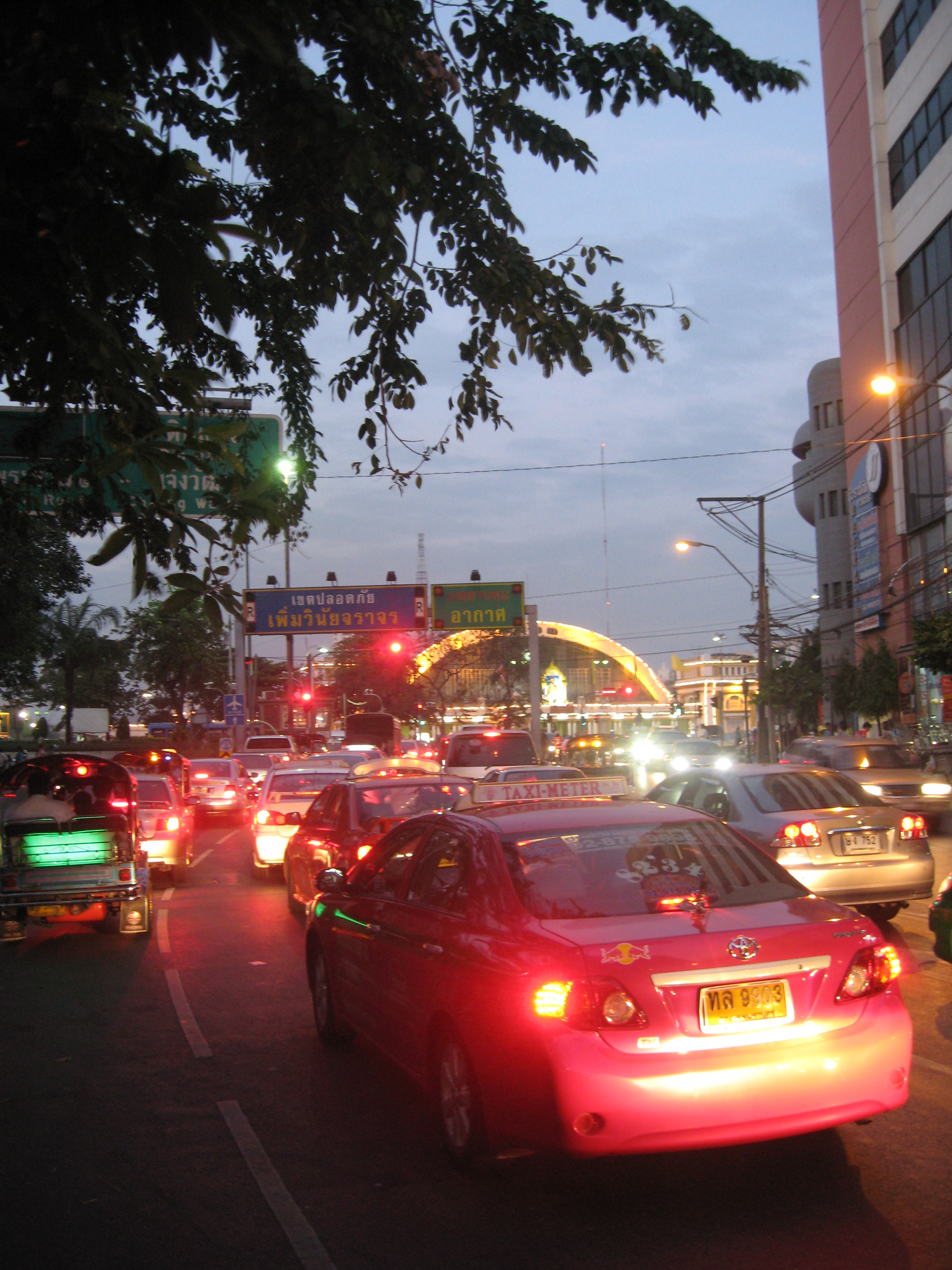
- Maha Phruettharam Road near Hua Lamphong in evening

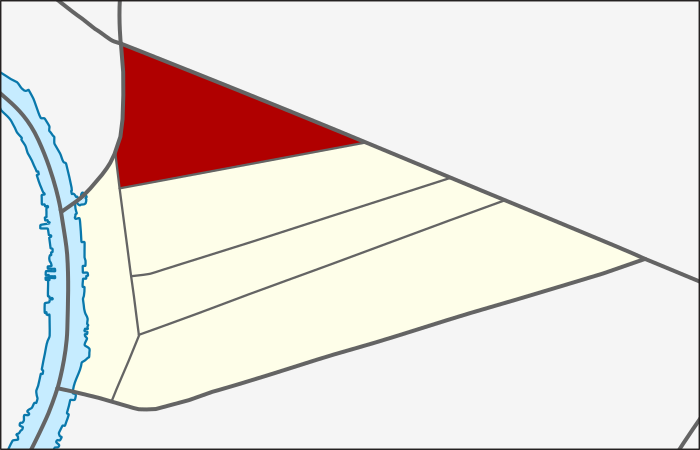
- Location in Bang Rak District
- Country: Thailand
- Province: Bangkok
- Khet: Bang Rak

Area
  - Total: 0.889 km^{2} (0.343 sq mi)

Population (2020)
  - Total: 10,527
- Time zone: UTC+7 (ICT)
- Postal code: 10500
- TIS 1099: 100401

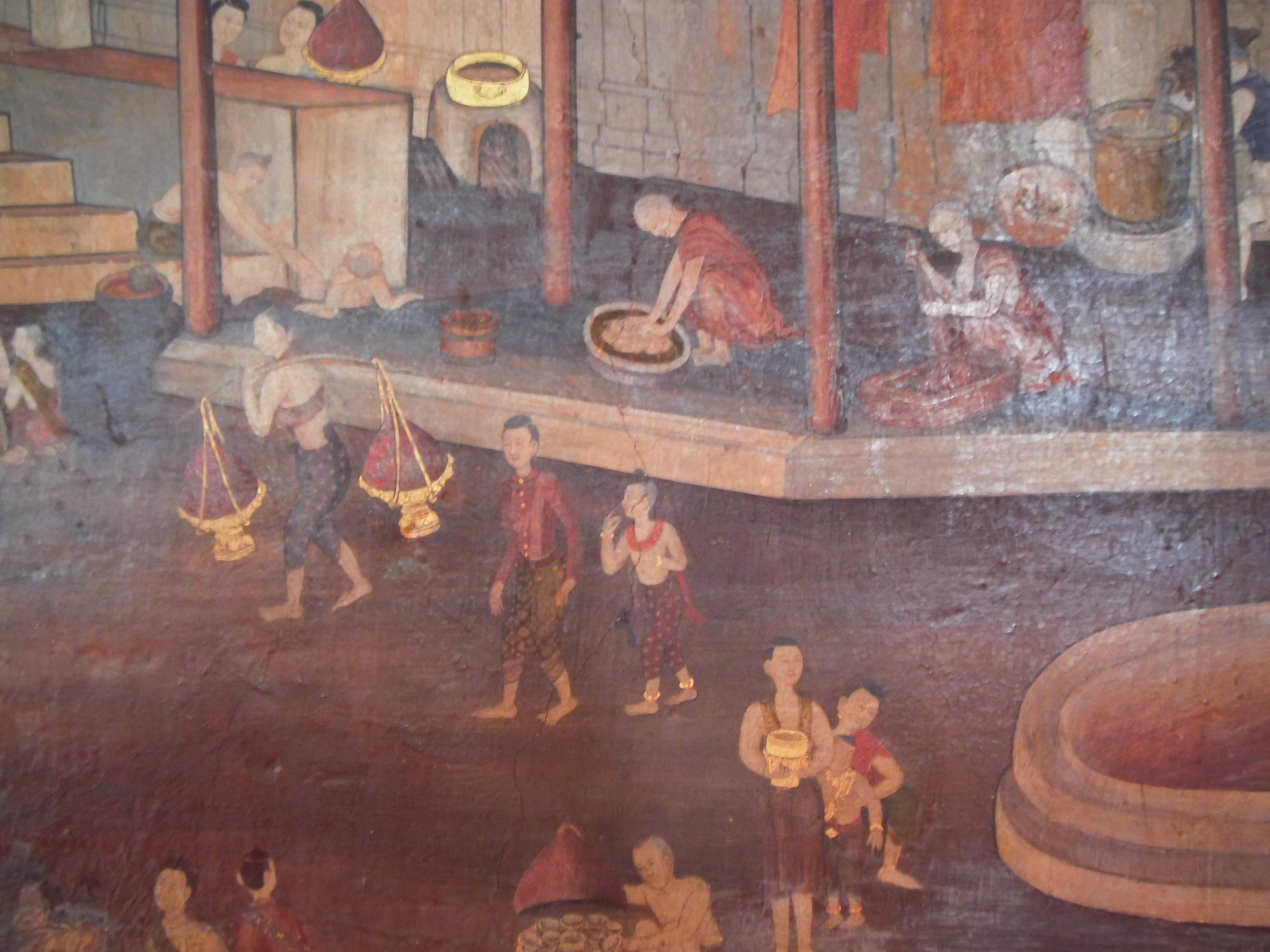
Mural painting of Wat Maha Phruettharam, the origin name of the subdistrict

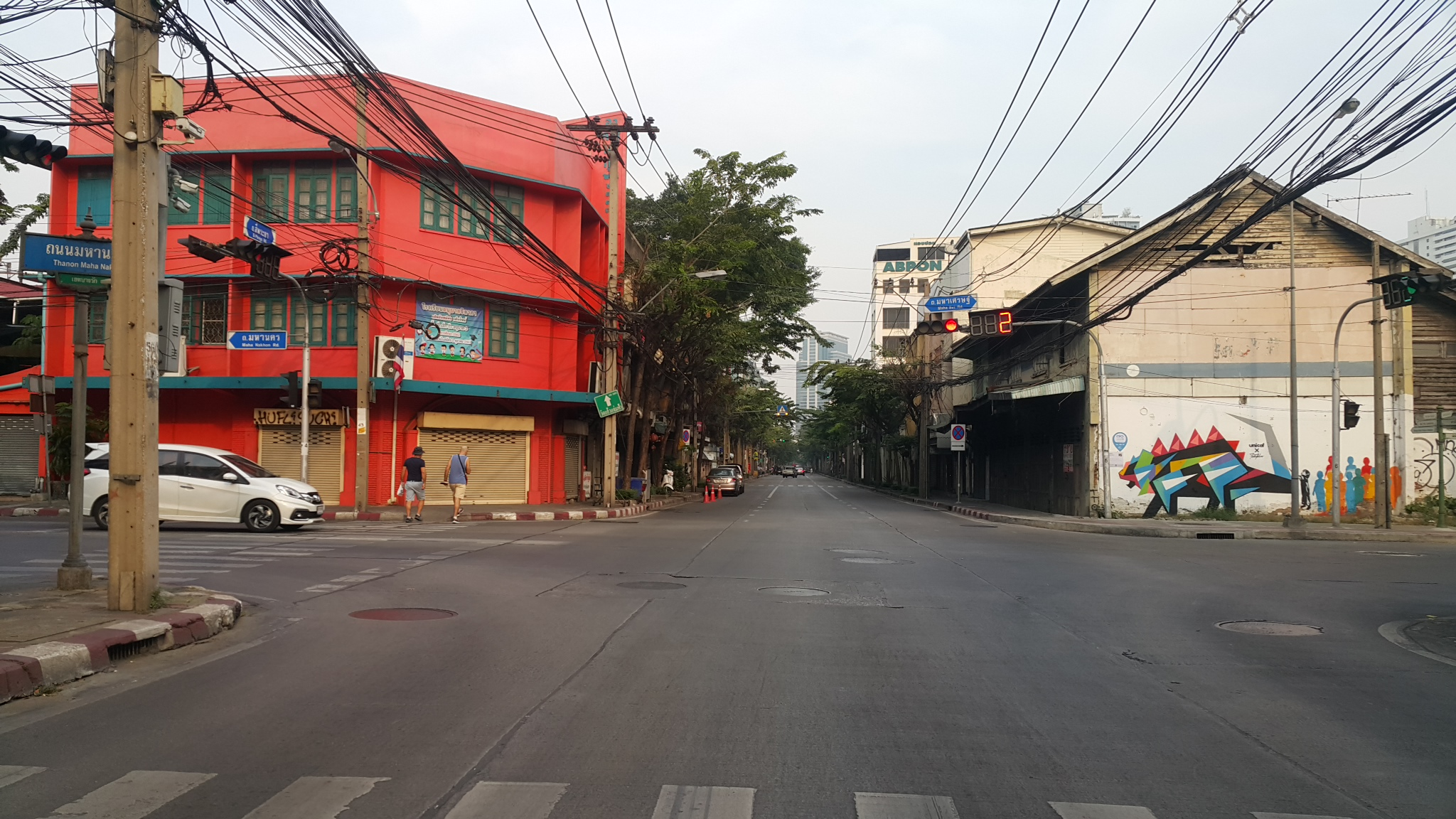
Maha Nakhon–Si Phraya Intersection, also known as Maha Set Intersection, where Si Phraya meets Maha Nakhon and Maha Set Roads overlaps the area of Si Phraya

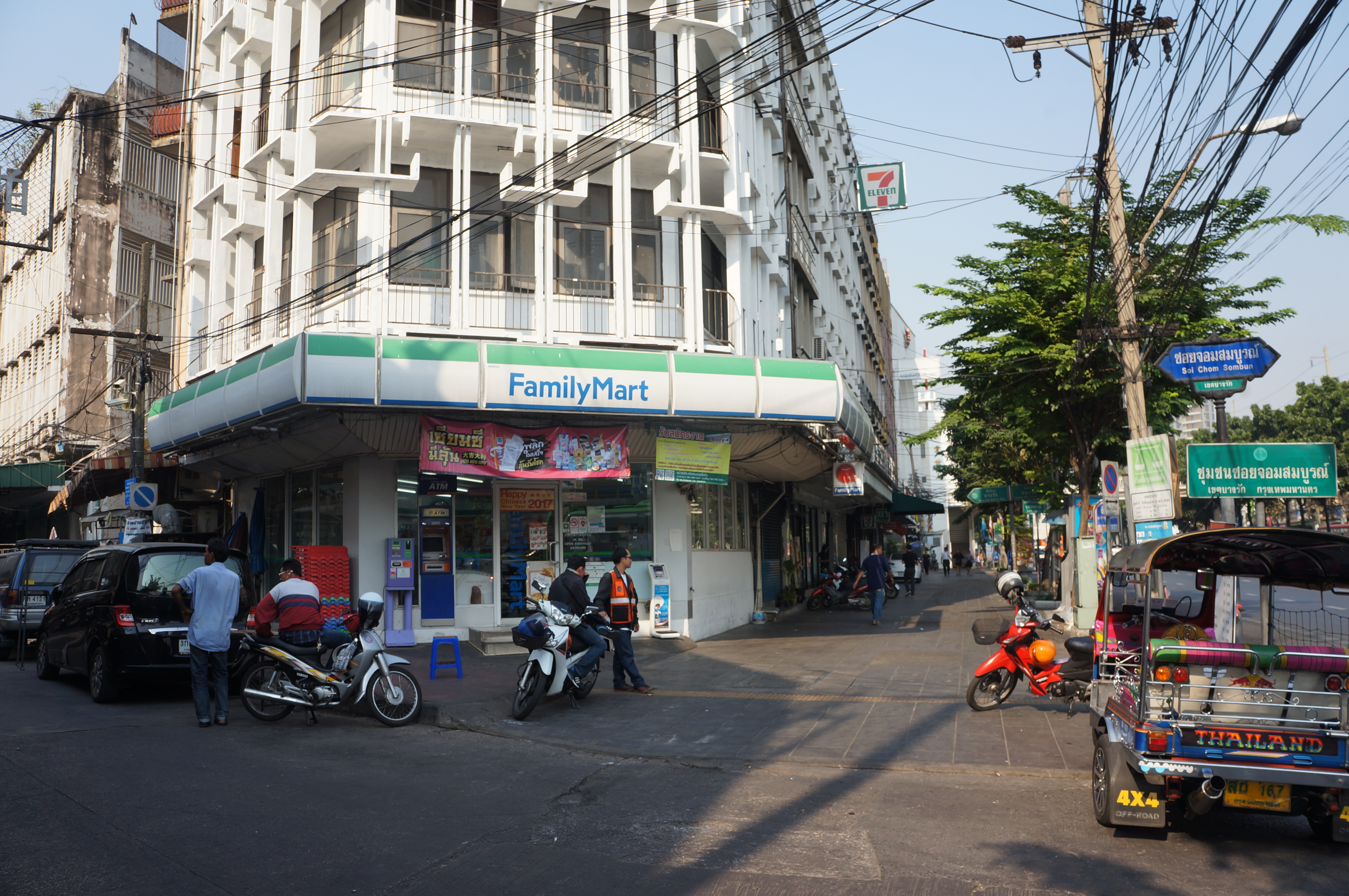
FamilyMart at the entrance of Soi Chom Sombun on the side of Rama IV Road inbound

Maha Phruettharam (Thai: มหาพฤฒาราม, pronounced [mā.hǎː pʰrɯ́t̚.tʰāː.rāːm]) is one of the five khwaeng (subdistrict) of Bang Rak District, Bangkok.

== History ==
The subdistrict is named after the local temple, Wat Maha Phruettharam Worawihan (วัดมหาพฤฒารามวรวิหาร), or known in short as Wat Maha Phruettharam, the third grade temple of worawihan, an old monastery whose exact origin is unknown, originally named Wat Tha Kwian (วัดท่าเกวียน).

The name of the temple is derived from the legend about the legendary king of Ayutthaya era, U-thong (the legendary king was not King U-Thong, founder of the Ayutthaya Kingdom). He had escaped cholera which was seriously spreading at the time. He travelled by kwian (wagon) and came to park his wagon in the area, but was told that area was the resting place from the travellers who travelled by the kwian.

Later, King Mongkut (Rama IV) named the temple Wat Takien (วัดตะเคียน), and he jointly built the new temple with his son, Prince Chulalongkorn (later King Chulalongkorn or Rama V). The temple was renovated and being raised to the royal temple and was renamed Wat Maha Phruettharam Worawihan by King Chulalongkorn.

This temple is regarded as one of the oldest and most remarkable temples in the area. Highlights of this temple include walls of the ordination hall are covered with beautiful murals depict the 13 ascetic practices of Buddhism from just above the floor right up to the ceiling, regarded as different from other temples, and in the third building, the sanctuary with a 19 m (62 ft) reclining Buddha in gold. Considered as the second largest reclining Buddha after the reclining Buddha of Wat Pho in Rattanakosin Island.

The temple situated on the left side of Maha Phruettharam Road, a short road that separates from Rama IV Road inbound at Hua Lamphong Intersection opposite to Bangkok Railway Station, more commonly known as Hua Lamphong, at the corner of Charoen Sawat 36 Bridge and parallel to Khlong Phadung Krung Kasem canal southward and bend slightly towards the west before dead-ends at the foot of Phitthaya Sathian Bridge, where it combines Charoen Krung Road. The road is located on the edge of Bang Rak and Samphanthawong Districts. It is served by only one BMTA's bus line 1.

== Geography ==
Maha Phruettharam can be considered the northernmost area of the district.

Neighbouring subdistricts are (from the north clockwise): Pom Prap of Pom Prap Sattru Phai District, Rong Mueang and Wang Mai of Pathum Wan District (Khlong Phadung Krung Kasem and Rama IV Road are the divider lines), Si Phraya and Bang Rak in its district (Si Phraya and Charoen Krung Roads are the divider lines), Talat Noi of Samphanthawong District (Khlong Phadung Krung Kasem is a divider line).

== Demography ==
In 2017 it had a total population of 11,609 people (5,396 men, 6,213 women) in 6,551 households.

== Places ==
=== Important places ===
- Wat Maha Phruettharam Worawihan
- Mahaprutharam Girls' School
- Wat Kaew Jam Fah (Wat Kaew Fah Lang)
- Siphraya Polytechnic College
- Mandarin Hotel Bangkok
- Central Labour Court and Pathum Wan District Court
- Sapanluang Church
- The Second Church Samyan
- Hua Lamphong MRT station (entrance 1, 4)
- Bangkok Centre Hotel

=== Transportation ===
- Rama IV Road
- Si Phraya Road
- Maha Phruettharam Road
- Maha Nakhon Road
