= Bang Rak district =

Bang Rak บางรัก
- District (khet)
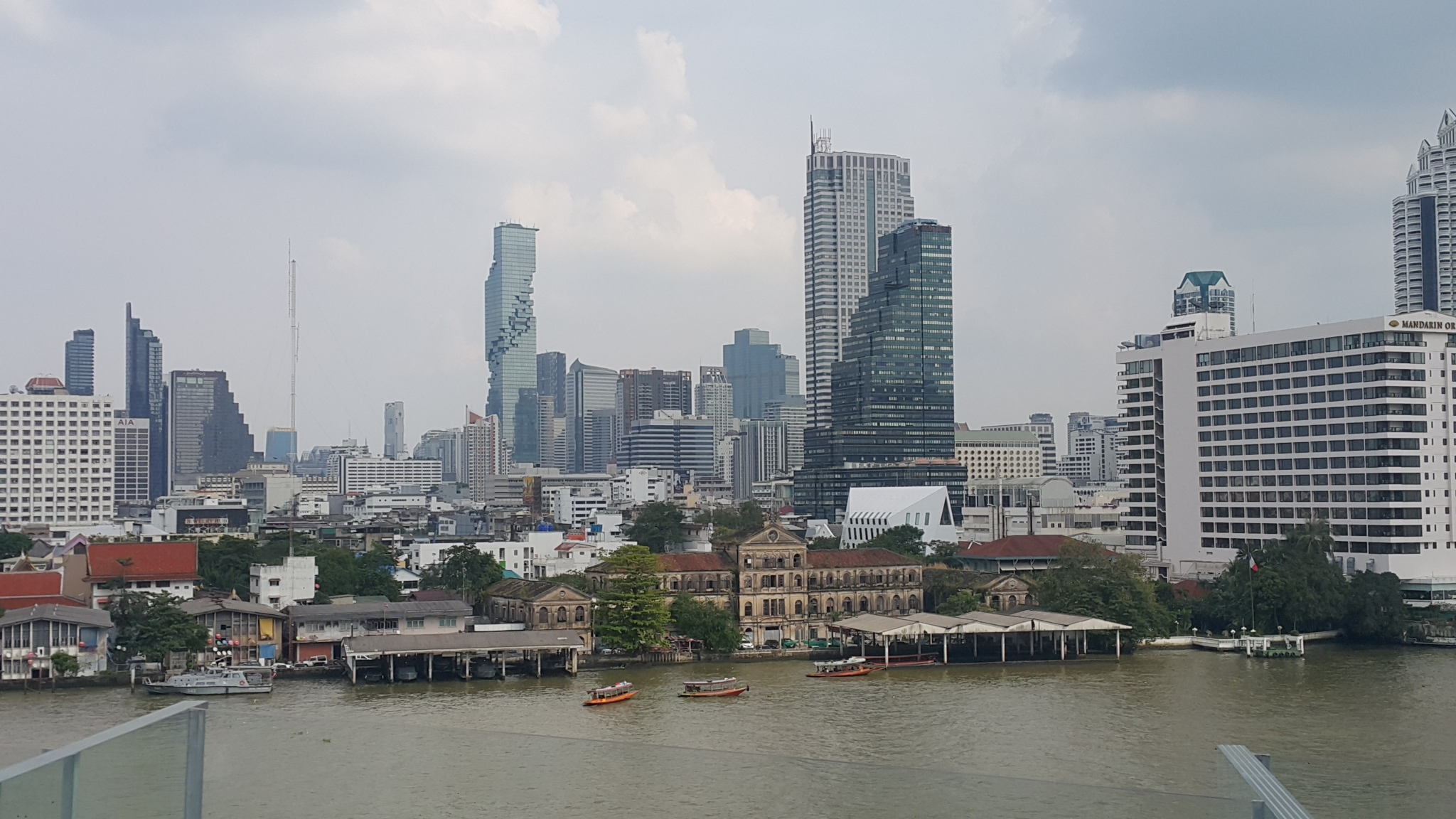
- Skyline of Bang Rak, from across the Chao Phraya River

- Location in Bangkok
- Coordinates (district office): 13°43′50″N 100°31′25″E
- Country: Thailand
- Province: Bangkok
- Established: 1908
- Seat: Si Phraya
- Khwaeng: 5

Area
  - Total: 5.54 km^{2} (2.14 sq mi)

Population (2019)
  - Total: 48,227
  - Density: 8,710/km^{2} (22,500/sq mi)
- Postal code: 10500
- Geocode: 1004
- Website: www.bangkok.go.th/bangrak

Bang Rak (Thai: บางรัก, pronounced [bāːŋ rák]) is one of the fifty districts (khet) of Bangkok, Thailand. It lies on the eastern bank of the Chao Phraya River, beyond Khlong Phadung Krung Kasem, which marked the old city boundary. Originating from riverside settlements dating from before the city's foundation, Bang Rak grew inland as new roads and canals were constructed through the area during the second half of the nineteenth century and the early twentieth, attracting communities of expatriates and developing into a major commercial district.

Bangkok's rapid economic growth in the late twentieth century saw the areas along Si Lom and Sathon roads transformed into one of the city's main business districts, teeming with skyscrapers. The district, officially recognised at least since 1908, covers an area of 5.54 square kilometres (2.14 sq mi), and has a registered population of 48,227 (as of 2019).

== History ==
Up until the mid-nineteenth century, water formed the primary mode of transport in the lower Chao Phraya plains, and most people lived along the banks of rivers and canals. Settlements had formed along the Chao Phraya River since the Ayutthaya Kingdom (14th century – 1767), and some Buddhist temples in and around Bang Rak date to the period. Bangkok became the capital city with the foundation of the Thonburi Kingdom in 1767, and was re-established as the Rattanakosin Kingdom in 1782; riverside areas beyond the fortified city of Rattanakosin Island developed into fringe neighbourhoods settled by various ethnic communities. Downstream of the city and just beyond the Chinatown area, the waterfront stretch that is now Bang Rak Subdistrict was home to Thais, Chinese, Vietnamese, Malays, Lao, Tavoyans, and descendants of Portuguese, among others. A Catholic church (now in the adjacent Talat Noi neighbourhood), dedicated to the Lady of the Rosary, was established by the Portuguese community in 1787. French priests then moved into the area for missionary work, followed by Protestants, mostly from the United States.

As international trade increased in the nineteenth century, the neighbourhood developed into one of many port areas along the river.

=== Urban development ===
By the time of King Mongkut's reign (Rama IV, 1851–1868), the city had outgrown its original defensive walls, and the King ordered the digging of Khlong Phadung Krung Kasem to serve as a new outer moat surrounding the city proper. The canal separated Bang Rak, on the far side from the city, from the Chinatown area, and as the country began modernizing and opened to the West under Mongkut's reign, European visitors began establishing themselves here. The Bowring Treaty was signed with the British in 1855, liberalizing trade and granting diplomatic concessions, and other Western countries followed suit. Consulates, trading companies and expatriate communities were established in the waterfront area, which became the city's European quarter.

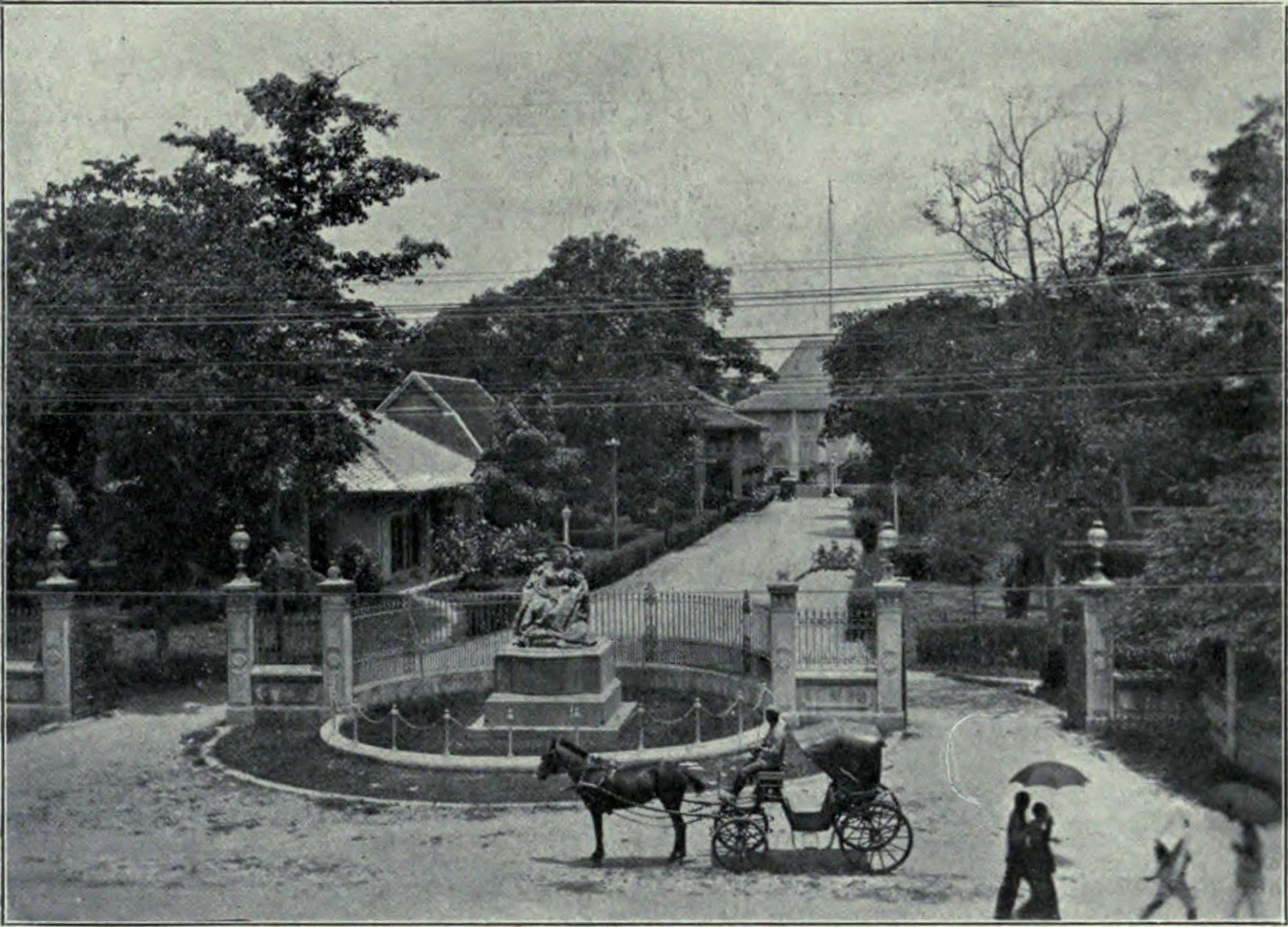
European governments set up diplomatic missions in Bang Rak. Among them was the British Legation, pictured c. 1908.

The Westerners also indirectly set off the city's transformation. They petitioned Mongkut to build roads for their use, first to the Phra Khanong area (to where they planned to relocate but later abandoned the idea), then to serve the waterfront community in Bang Rak. The King obliged, and had Thanon Trong (also known as Hua Lamphong Road and later to become Rama IV Road) constructed in 1857 and Charoen Krung Road in 1862. Si Lom Road soon followed, linking the two. The introduction of land-based transport transformed the city, and Charoen Krung became its main thoroughfare, bringing commerce and spurring development.

In the 1890s and 1900s, during the reign of King Chulalongkorn (Rama V, 1868–1910), enterprising businessmen engaged in land development by buying up land and building roads through the area. The resulting Sathon, Surawong, and Si Phraya roads ran roughly parallel to Si Lom, and, together with a few connecting roads between them, have since formed the district's main road network.

The development attracted businesses, which established numerous shops along the roads, as well as newly wealthy residents, who made their homes in villas. Emerging ethnic communities were formed by migrants arriving from Western colonies, who found advantage in the treaties' extraterritorial provisions. Among them were Javanese Muslims, and Hindus, Muslims, and Jains from India, who established places of worship in their neighbourhoods, joining the Christian churches as the missionaries continued to expand their work through the founding of schools and hospitals. The roads were soon augmented by rail transport, as the Paknam Railway (the country's first line) opened along Thanon Trong in 1893, and electrified trams began running on Charoen Krung Road the following year. Another tram line, along Si Lom Road, opened in 1925.

=== Post-war development ===
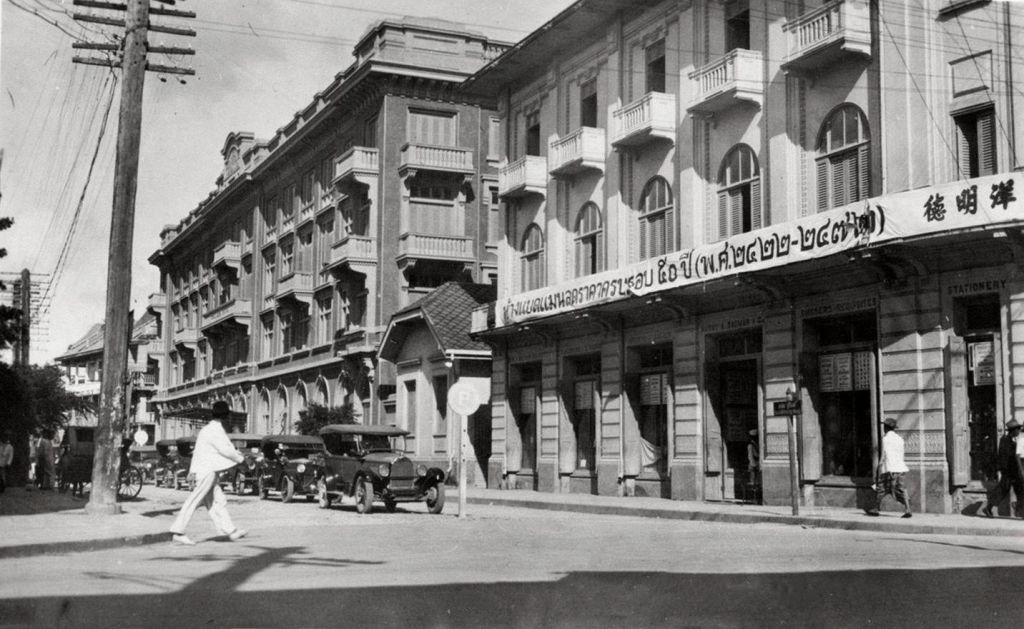
The Trocadero Hotel (centre-left) and Harry A. Badman & Co. (right) were among many businesses occupying premises on Surawong Road in 1929.

Bang Rak District gradually proceeded to fill up with development, and in the post-World War II period, increasing numbers of foreign businesses moved from the waterfront area into newer premises, especially along Si Lom Road. In 1963, the trams were discontinued, and the canal that ran alongside Si Lom road was filled in for its expansion, further incentivizing its development as a business street. (Many of the roads had originally been built with canals running alongside, using the excavated earth. The Paknam Railway was also discontinued, in 1960.) The Dusit Thani Hotel, the city's first high-rise building, opened in 1970, initiating a wave of high-rise construction along Si Lom and Sathon as the economy boomed through the early 1990s. While the 1997 financial crisis put an end to the boom, the economy eventually recovered.

The earliest government proclamation naming Bang Rak as a district dates to 1908, and it was re-established with boundaries near its present form in 1915. Its status, along with Bangkok's other districts', was later changed from amphoe to khet in 1972. The district is named Bang Rak after the original waterfront settlement. While bang is a common place name prefix for villages situated on a rivers, the origins of the second word are unclear. Early documents variably spelled the name as บางรัก or บางรักษ์; the first (and current) spelling fits with the theory that it derived from that of the rak (Gluta usitata) tree, a large trunk of which had been found in the area, while the second favours the idea that the name came from the word rak (รักษ์ 'heal'), after hospitals operated by the area's missionaries. Today, as rak is also a homonym alternatively meaning "love", the name makes the district office a popular place for marriage registrations, especially on Valentine's Day.

== Geography and administration ==
Bang Rak District occupies 5.536 square kilometres (2.137 sq mi) in Bangkok's Phra Nakhon side, on the east bank of the Chao Phraya River. It is bordered by Pathum Wan district to the northeast across Rama IV Road, Sathon to the southeast across Khlong Sathon (in the middle of Sathon Road), Khlong San to the west on the other side of the Chao Phraya, and Samphanthawong to the northwest, across Khlong Phadung Krung Kasem.

District map

The district's main thoroughfares, in addition to Rama IV and Sathon roads, which serve as its borders, are Charoen Krung Road, which runs roughly alongside the river, and (from north to south) Si Phraya, Surawong and Si Lom roads, which run in a southwest–northeast direction, roughly parallel to Sathon, linking Rama IV and Charoen Krung. They divide the district into five subdistricts (khwaeng). Bang Rak Subdistrict is on the riverside west of Charoen Krung. East of it, from north to south, are Maha Phruettharam, Si Phraya, Suriyawong, and Si Lom. Together, they have a registered population of 48,227 as of 2019.

Subdistricts (khwaeng) of Bang Rak District
	Name		Area (km^{2})	Geocode	Population (2019)
1	Maha Phruettharam	มหาพฤฒาราม	0.889	100401	10,980
2	Si Lom	สีลม	2.074	100402	18,713
3	Suriyawong	สุริยวงศ์	0.820	100403	5,075
4	Bang Rak	บางรัก	0.689	100404	2,760
5	Si Phraya	สี่พระยา	1.064	100405	10,699

Several streets run between the parallel roads, forming links between them. The only one to cross all of them is Maha Nakhon–Maha Set–Mahesak–Surasak, each section of which is known by a different name as it runs from Rama IV at Maha Nakhon Intersection to meet Sathon Road at Sathon–Surasak Intersection, with the elevated Si Rat Expressway running nearby. Others include Sap and Naret roads between Si Phraya and Surawong, Decho Road between Surawong and Si Lom, and Sala Daeng, Convent, Pan and Pramuan roads between Si Lom and Sathon. These are relatively small streets, except Naradhiwas Rajanagarindra Road, which runs alongside Khlong Chong Nonsi from Surawong through Sathon, continuing southeastward towards Rama III Road in Yan Nawa district. On the other side of Bang Rak, Maha Phruettharam Road runs alongside Khlong Phadung Krung Kasem, also linking between Rama IV (at Hua Lamphong Intersection) and Charoen Krung (at Phitthayasathian Bridge).

=== Neighbourhoods ===
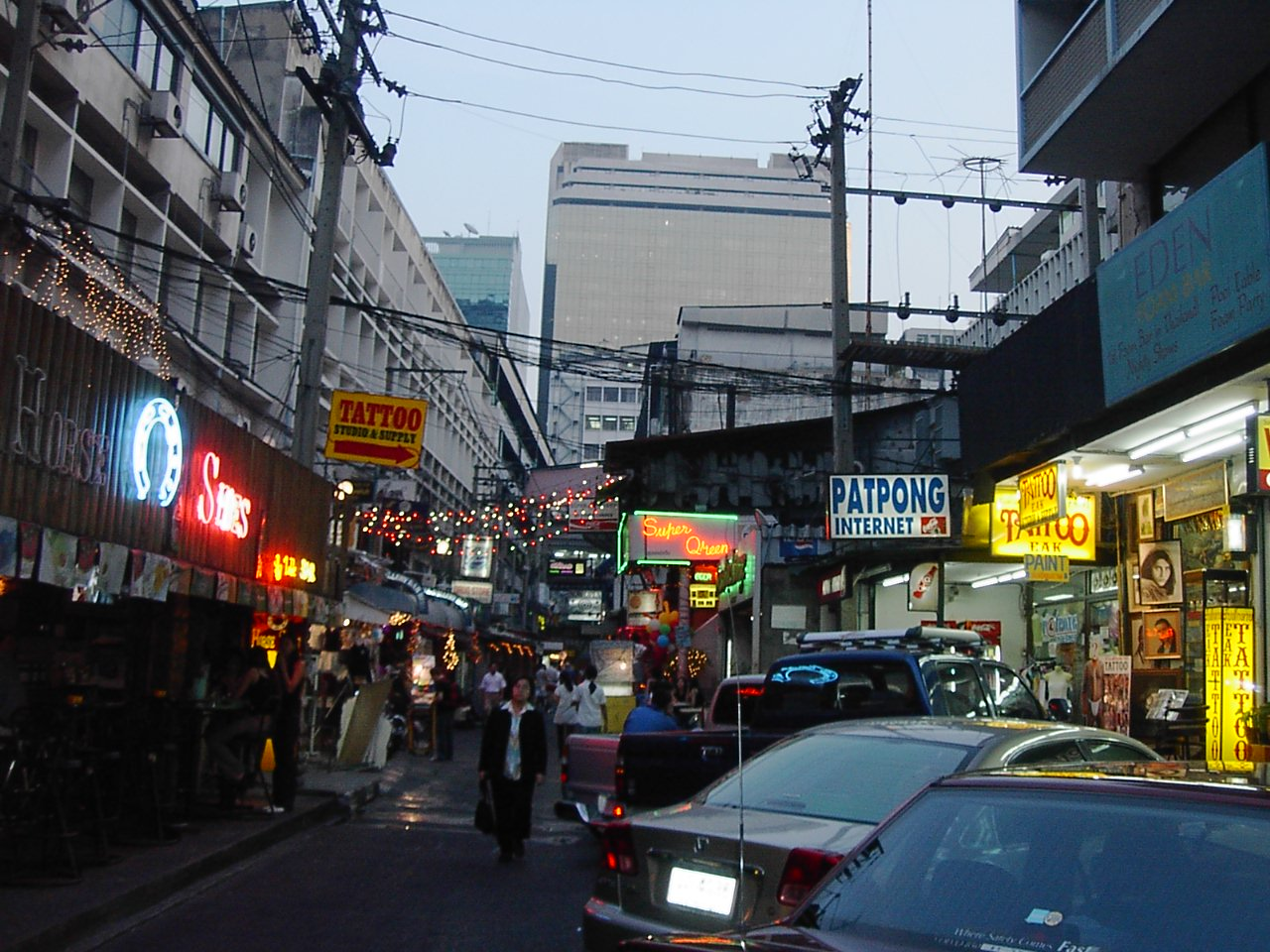
Patpong is well known as a red-light district catering to foreigners.

Bang Rak District contains some highly developed areas. Commercial development is most concentrated around Si Lom and Sathon roads, while the areas towards Maha Phruettharam are quieter and mostly residential. Development also fronts Rama IV Road, especially around the neighbourhoods surrounding its intersections: Saphan Lueang (where it is met by Banthat Thong Road in Pathum Wan District), Sam Yan (where Si Phraya Road meets Phaya Thai), Henri Dunant (Surawong and Henri Dunant), Sala Daeng (Si Lom and Ratchadamri), and Witthayu (Sathon and Witthayu).

The side streets of Si Lom Road form several distinctive neighbourhoods, several of which, like Sala Daeng and Convent, feature restaurants and open spaces nestled behind office towers fronting the main road. Near Si Lom's east end, on the north side (in Suriyawong Subdistrict), several side streets are home to a concentration of nightlife venues. Among them, the Patpong neighbourhood is well known as a red-light district catering to foreigners. On the south side (in Si Lom Subdistrict), near Si Lom–Naradhiwas Intersection, Soi Lalai Sap is a popular office worker's shopping street. Towards the road's Charoen Krung end (Bang Rak Junction), the office towers peter out, and the neighbourhood is marked by the historic Tamil Indian presence; the area around Mahesak Road (between Si Lom and Surawong) is also known as a jewellery district.

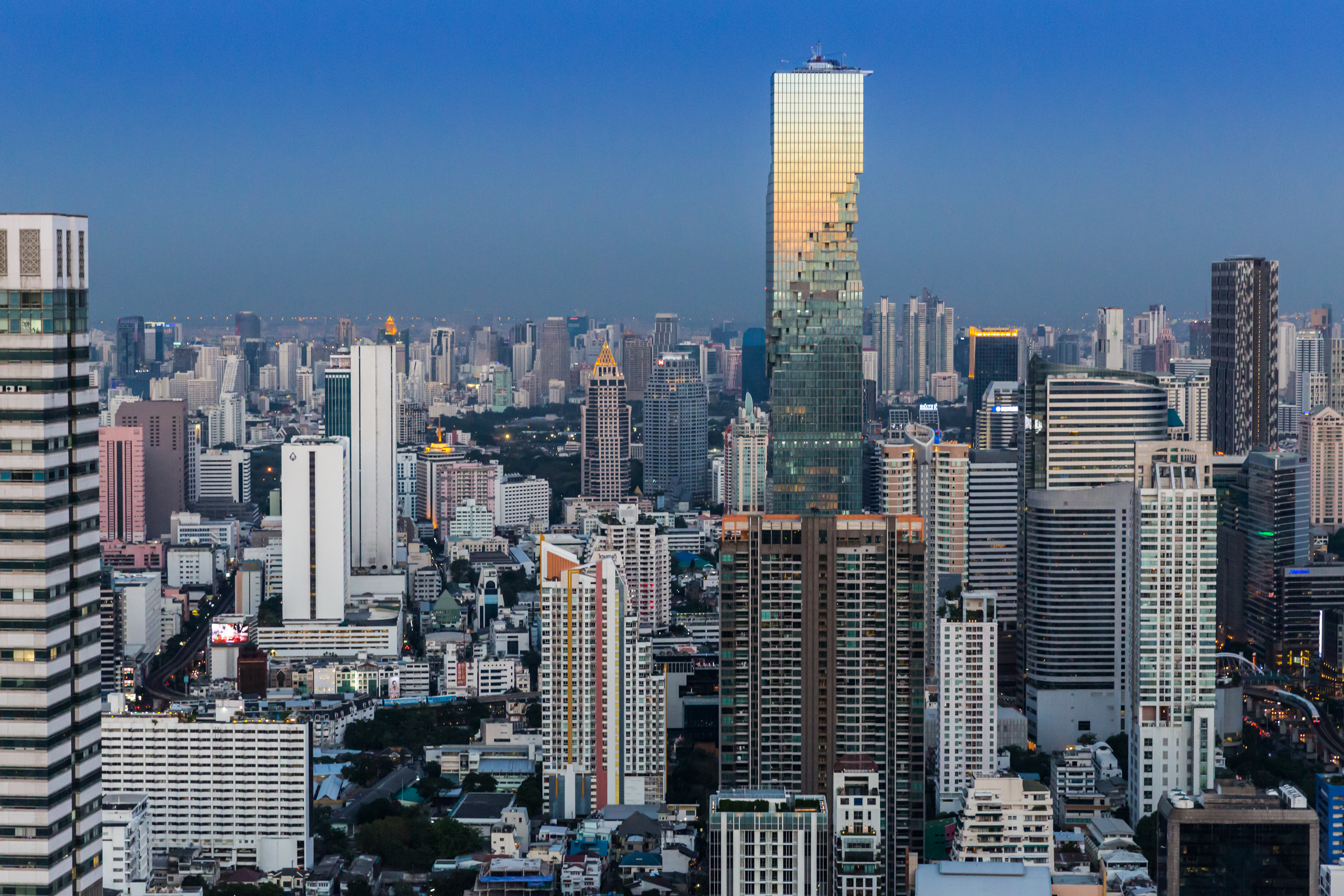
King Power Mahanakhon stands out amidst the high-rises of Si Lom and Sathon roads in the Si Lom subdistrict.

Sathon Road, meanwhile, has a more sterile appearance, with office towers, hotels, and religious, educational and health institutions occupying large blocks along the road. Sathon–Naradhiwas Intersection, near the middle of the road's length, is in particular surrounded by gleaming glass-walled skyscrapers. While establishments line the road on both sides, Bang Rak District only covers those on the north; the road's south side is in the area of Sathon District. The combined Si Lom–Sathon business district generates a large amount of economic activity and employment. Despite being among the country's smallest districts by area, Bang Rak has Bangkok's largest number of jobs, with over 170,000 positions based in the district as of 2016, according to a job-seeking service company.

The flurry of activity, however, doesn't reach the waterfront area along Charoen Krung Road (mostly covered by Bang Rak Subdistrict), which retains much of its historic architecture. While commercially the area had long been eclipsed by newer development, revitalisation efforts since the 2010s have aimed to revive the neighbourhood as a creative district. The area's side streets, such as Soi Charoen Krung 36 and Captain Bush Lane, feature heritage buildings that serve as cultural tourism destinations.

== Notable locations ==
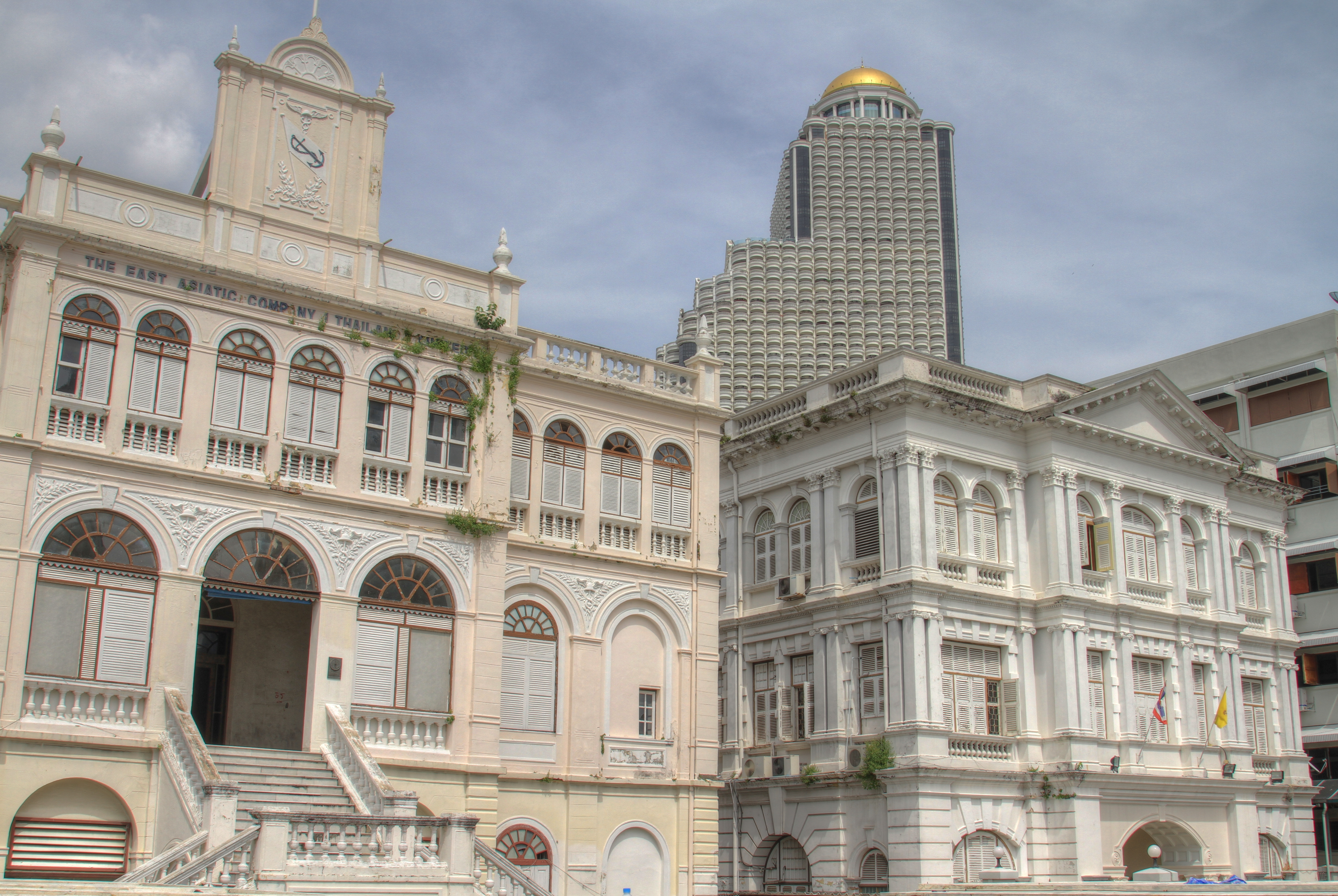
The historic East Asiatic Building (left) and Banque de l'Indochine line the waterfront, while State Tower rises above the neighbourhood.

Among the best known features of Bang Rak District are the skyscrapers of Si Lom and Sathon, some of which—Mahanakhon, State Tower, and Jewelry Trade Center—are among the tallest buildings in the country. They stand in contrast to colonial-era historic buildings such as the Neilson Hays Library and the British Club on Surawong Road, and the Sathon Mansion near Sathon–Naradhiwas Intersection. Other historic buildings are concentrated in the waterfront Charoen Krung area, including the nineteenth-century Portuguese and French embassies, Customs House, East Asiatic Building, and original Author's Wing of the Mandarin Oriental Hotel.

Dating later, from 1940, the General Post Office building on Charoen Krung Road now houses the Thailand Creative & Design Center, a sponsor of the Creative District project. From the same period, the Bangkokian Museum and Bang Rak District Local Museum, on a side street of Charoen Krung near Maha Set Road, showcases a middle-class family home of the time and features exhibits about the district's history.

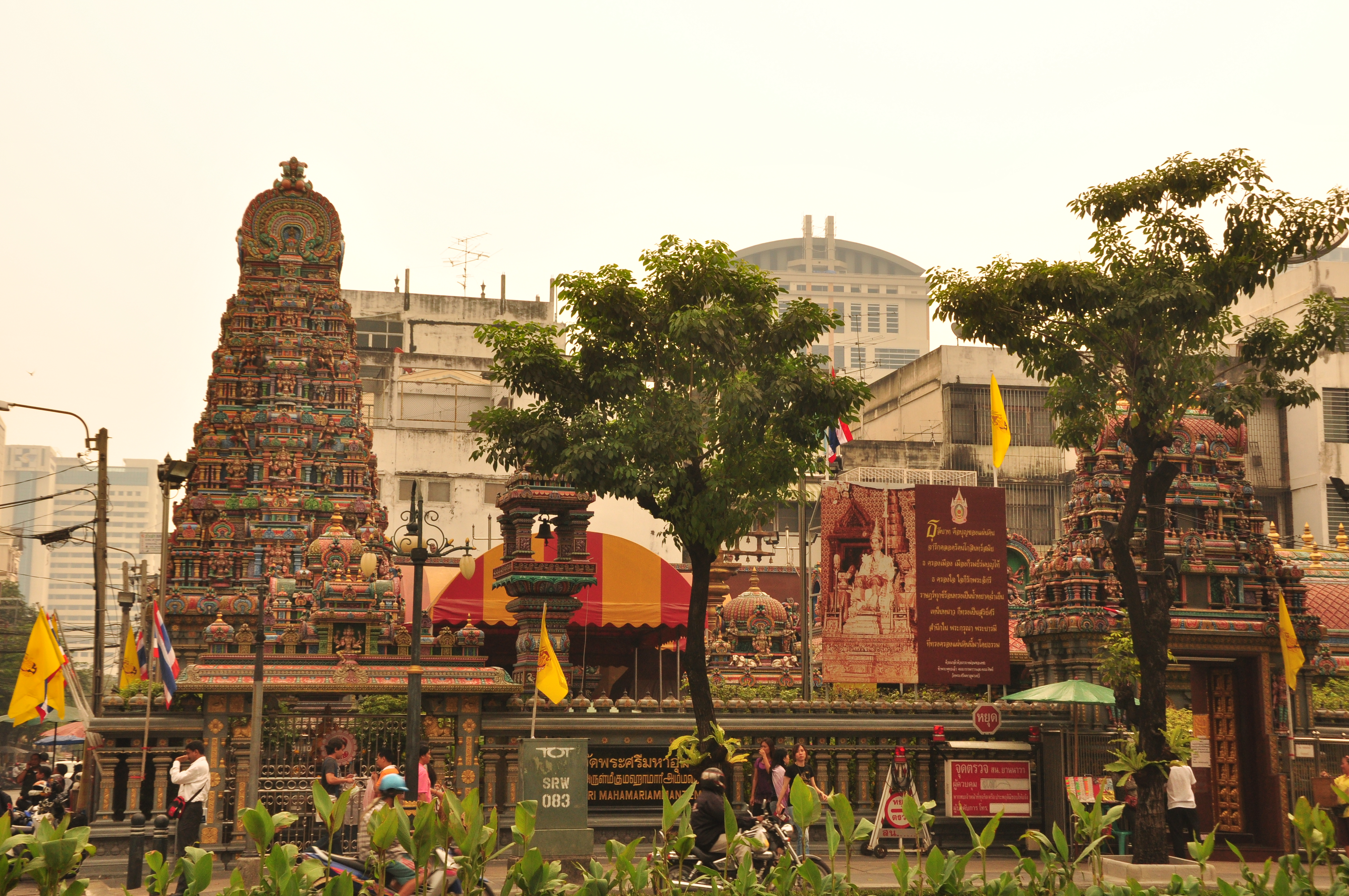
Sri Mahamariamman Temple is a major landmark on Si Lom Road

Some of Bang Rak's most noticeable points of interest are places of worship, the diversity of which reflect the area's multicultural history. While the district is home to centuries-old Buddhist temples including Wat Maha Phruettharam (on the same-named road), Wat Hua Lamphong (at Sam Yan Intersection), and Wat Suan Phlu and Wat Muang Khae on the waterfront, it is the outsize representation of minority religious communities that generate special interest. The Sri Mahamariamman Temple on the corner of Si Lom and Pan roads is the city's largest Hindu temple, serving the Tamil community, while Soi Phuttha-osot off Maha Set Road is home to two Jain temples and the Tamil Muslim Bangkok Mosque. Other mosques include the Javanese Masjid Mirasuddeen on Soi Si Lom 20, and the Ban Oou and Haroon mosques, which anchor their historic communities in the riverside area.

The influence of the Christian missionaries is clearly observable in Bang Rak, not least from their churches—the Assumption Cathedral near the river is the seat of the Roman Catholic Archdiocese of Bangkok, while over a dozen Protestant churches are located in the district—but also through the schools and hospitals they founded. The Catholic Church operates Assumption College, Assumption Convent and Assumption Suksa schools, all near the cathedral, as well as Saint Joseph Convent School, situated off Si Lom on Convent Road, opposite the Carmelite Monastery.

Also on Convent Road, on its corner with Sathon, is the historic Christ Church Bangkok, today a parish church of the Anglican Church in Thailand. The country's main Protestant denomination, the Church of Christ in Thailand, operates Bangkok Christian College, the country's oldest school, which sits on the corner of Sathon and Pramuan roads, as well as the Bangkok Christian Hospital on Si Lom. Other hospitals also have histories related to the Western presence: Lerdsin Hospital (on Si Lom Road, near Bang Rak Intersection) was first headed by Thomas Heyward Hays, a doctor with the Presbyterian mission, while BNH Hospital was founded as a nursing home by the British community. The other hospital in the district is Mahaesak Hospital, and other secondary schools include the state-run Mahapruttaram Girls' School and Buddhajak Wittaya School.

== Transport ==
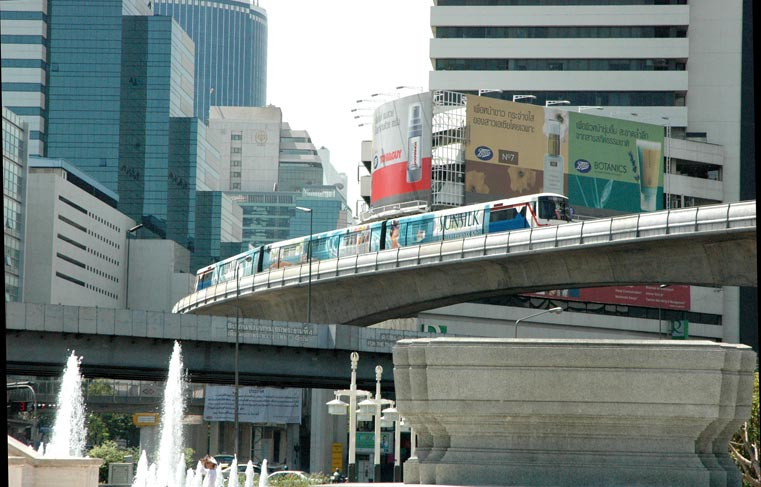
The BTS Skytrain passing over Sala Daeng Intersection, the beginning of Si Lom Road

Bang Rak is served by the Silom Line of the BTS Skytrain and the Blue Line of the MRT, as well as the Chao Phraya Express Boat and regular bus services. The Si Rat Expressway has ramps at Rama IV and Si Lom/Sathon roads.

The MRT runs under Rama IV Road along the district's northern border, with Hua Lamphong, Sam Yan, Si Lom (at Sala Daeng Intersection), and Lumphini (at Witthayu) stations serving the respective neighbourhoods. The Si Lom MRT Station has a link to the BTS's Sala Daeng Station, from where the elevated railway runs along Si Lom Road before turning into Naradhiwas Rajanagarindra, where Chong Nonsi Station is. It continues onto Sathon Road, serving the Saint Louis, Surasak, and Saphan Taksin stations. The last sits on Taksin Bridge, a major road link across the river, and provides a connection to the express boat's Sathorn Pier. Other piers for the boat service are Oriental, Wat Muang Kae, and Si Phraya.

== Gallery ==
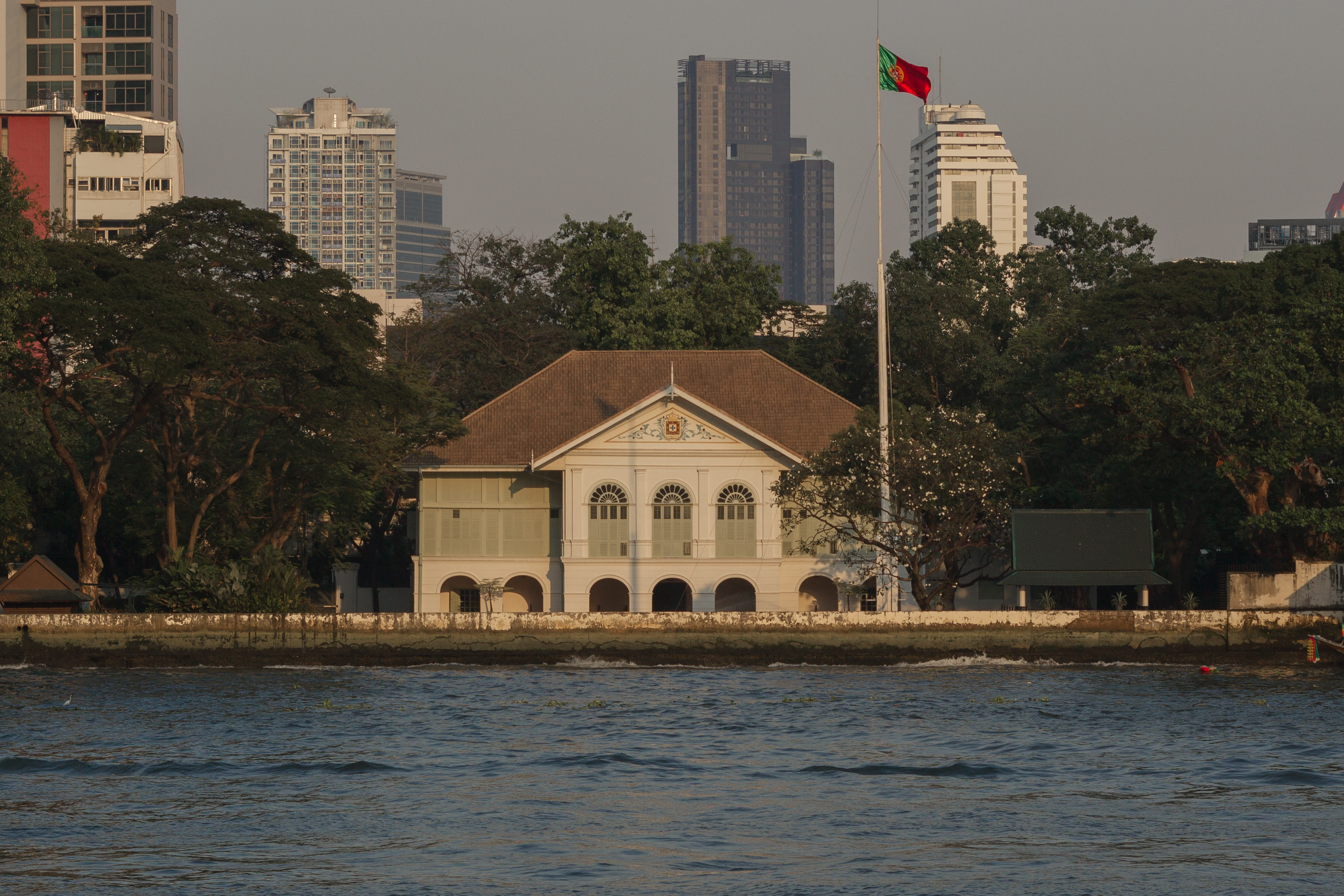
Portuguese Embassy

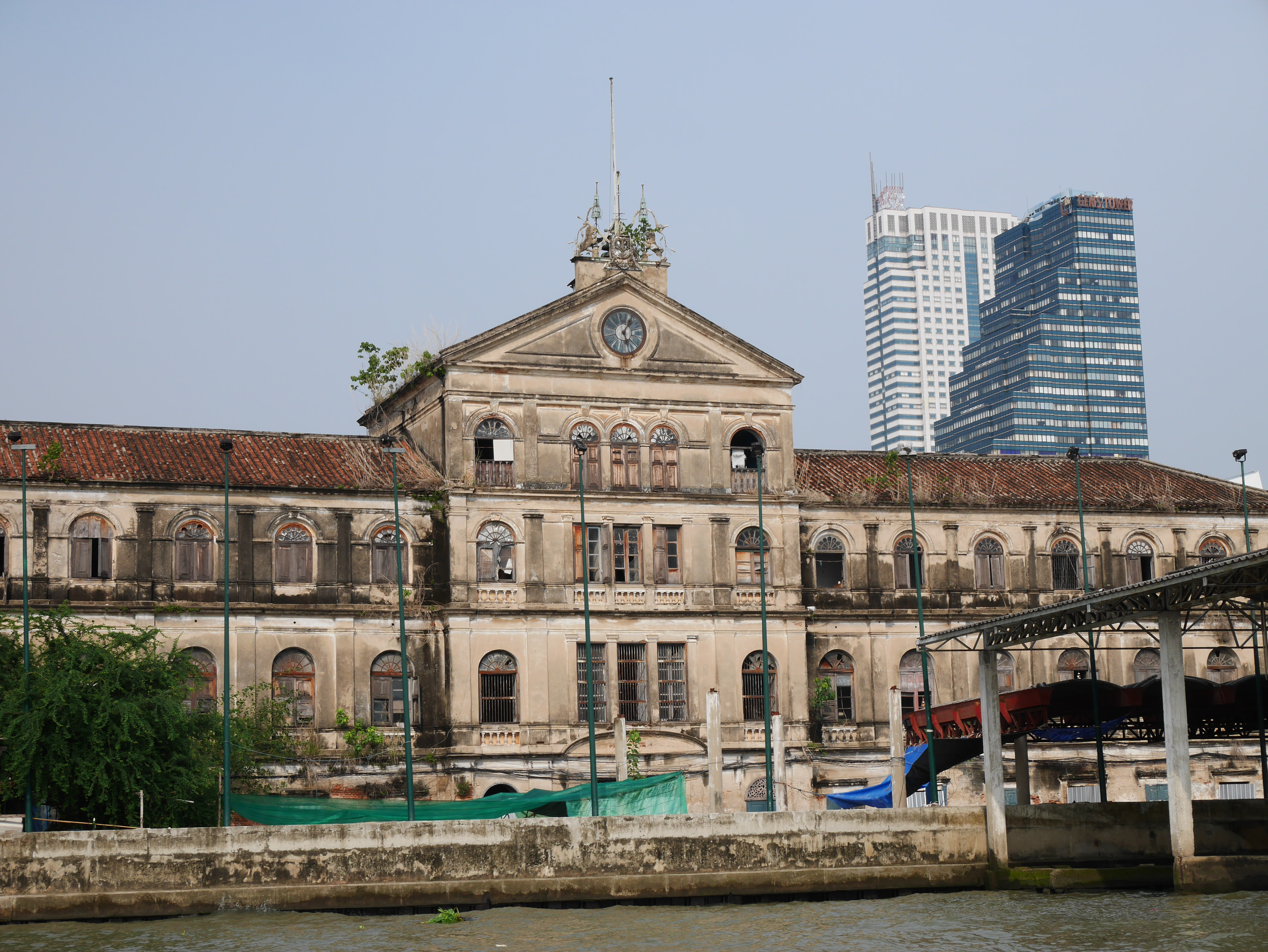
Customs House

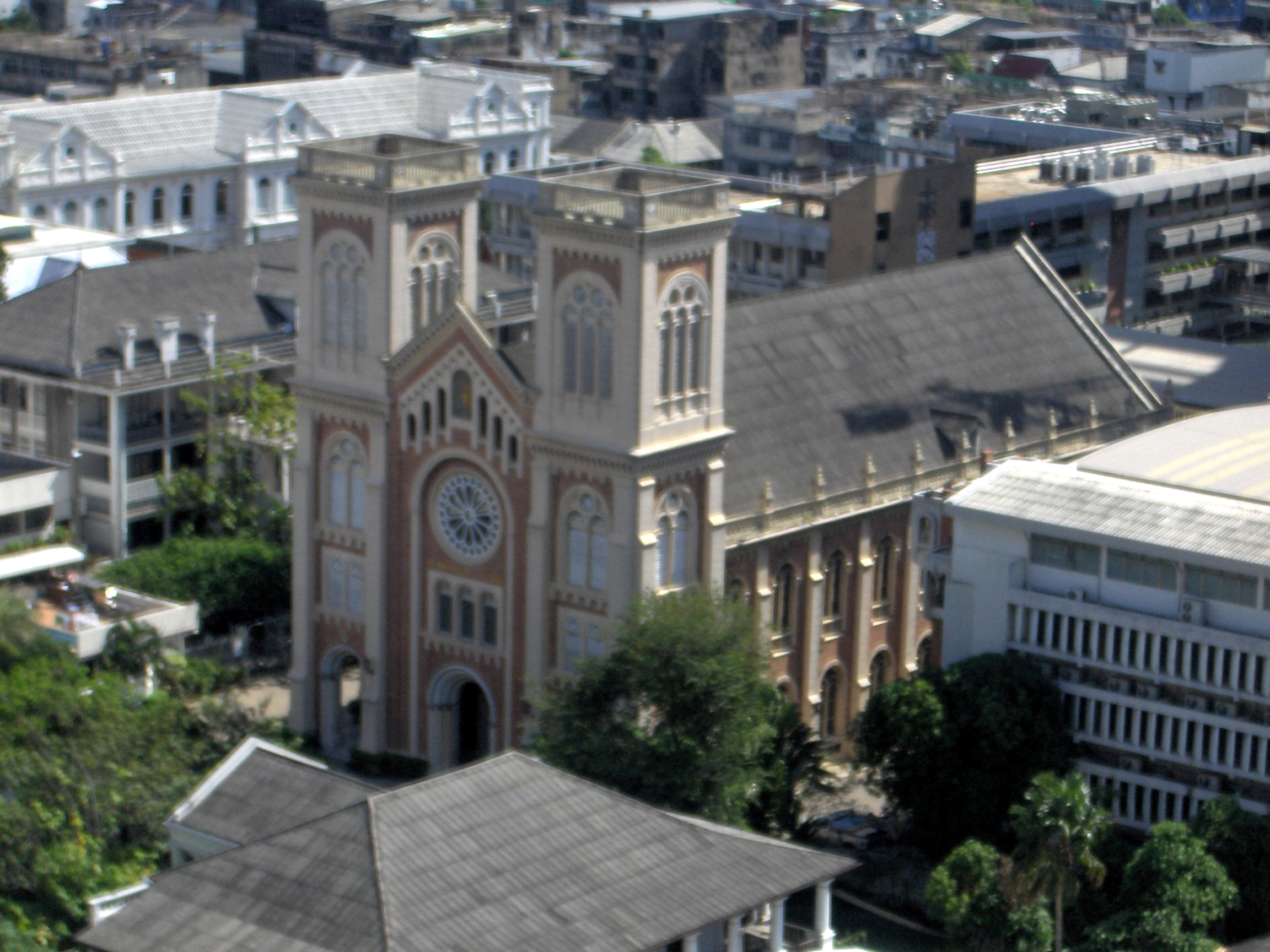
Assumption Cathedral

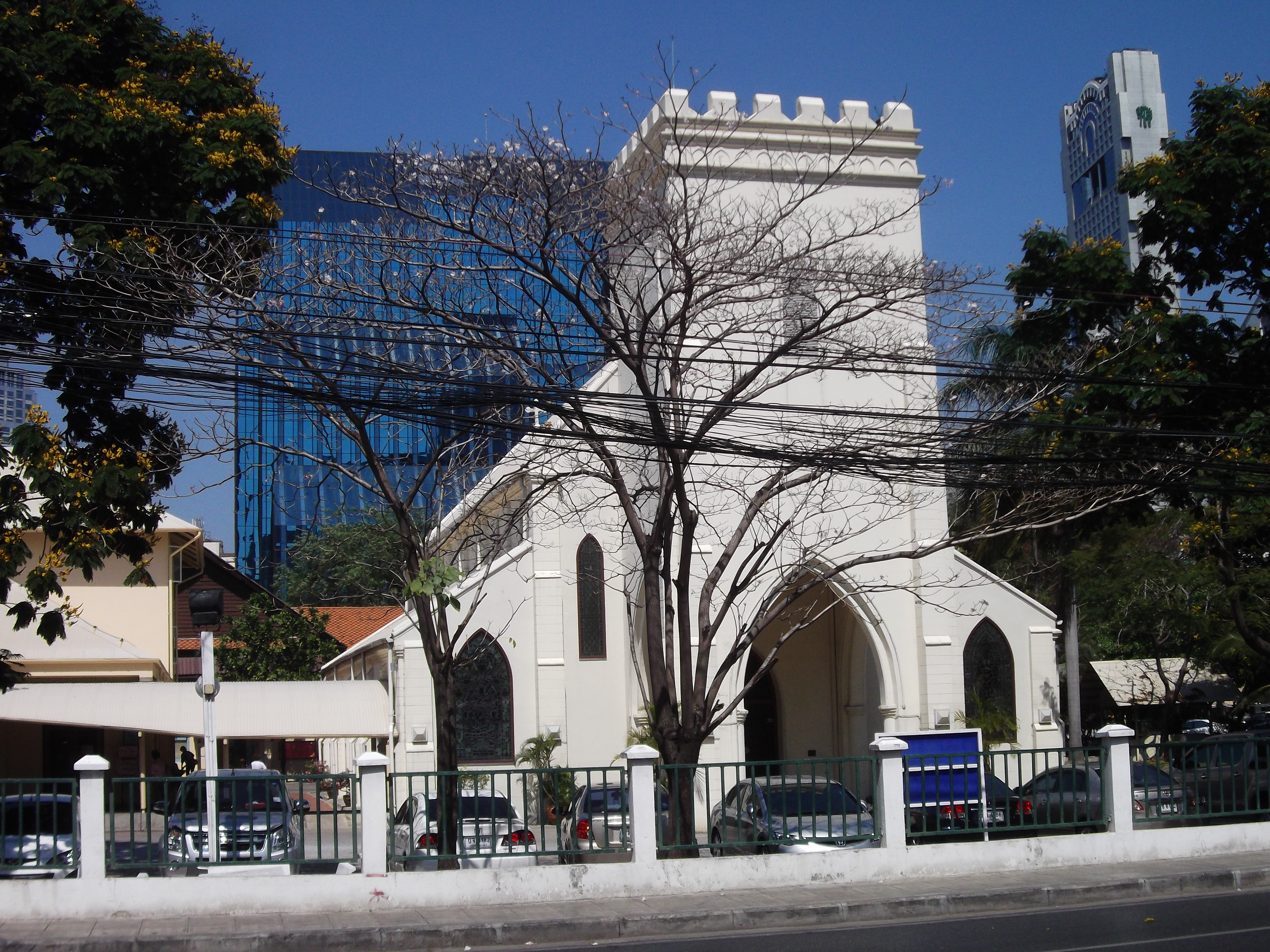
Christ Church Bangkok

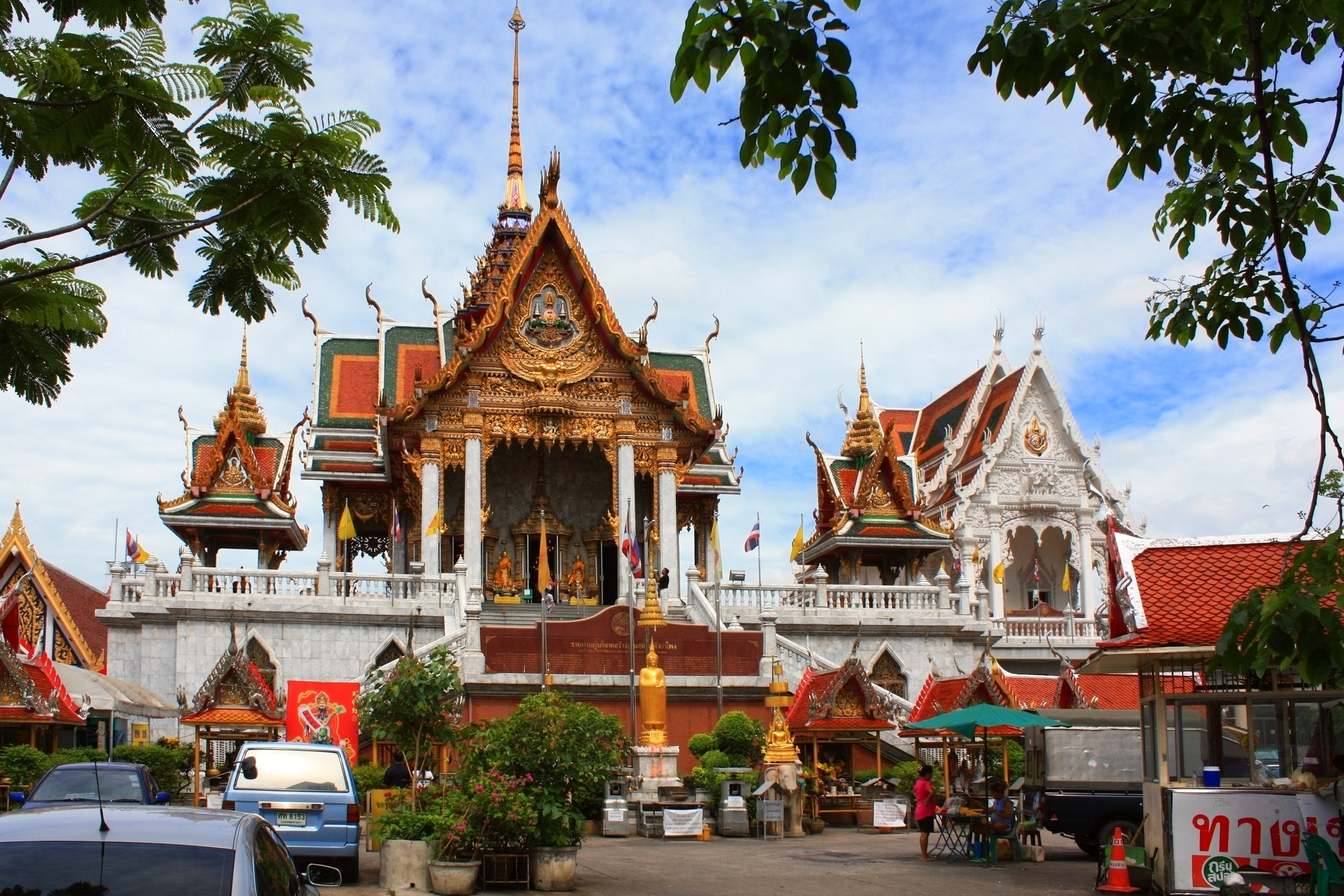
Wat Hua Lamphong

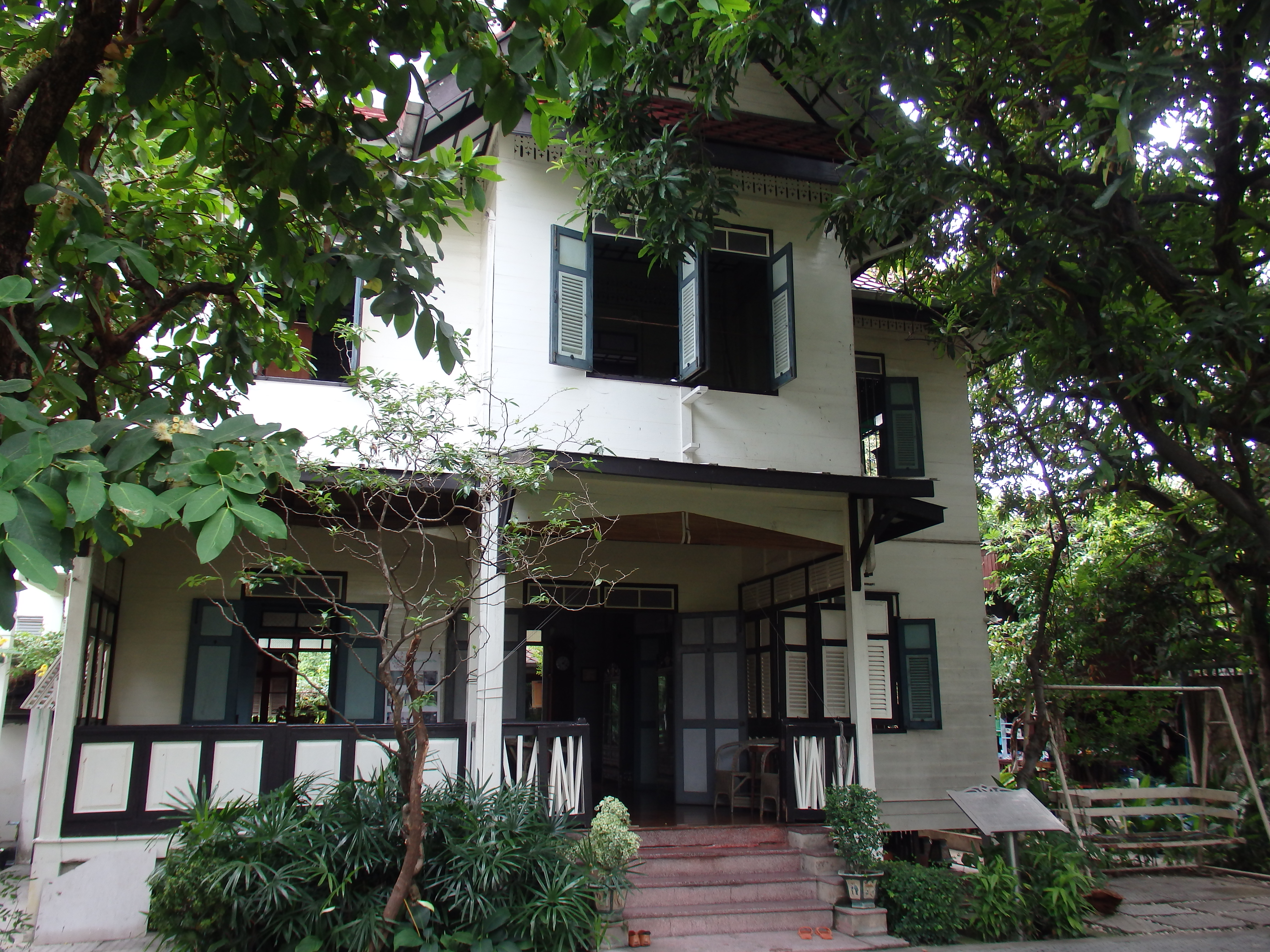
Bangkokian Museum

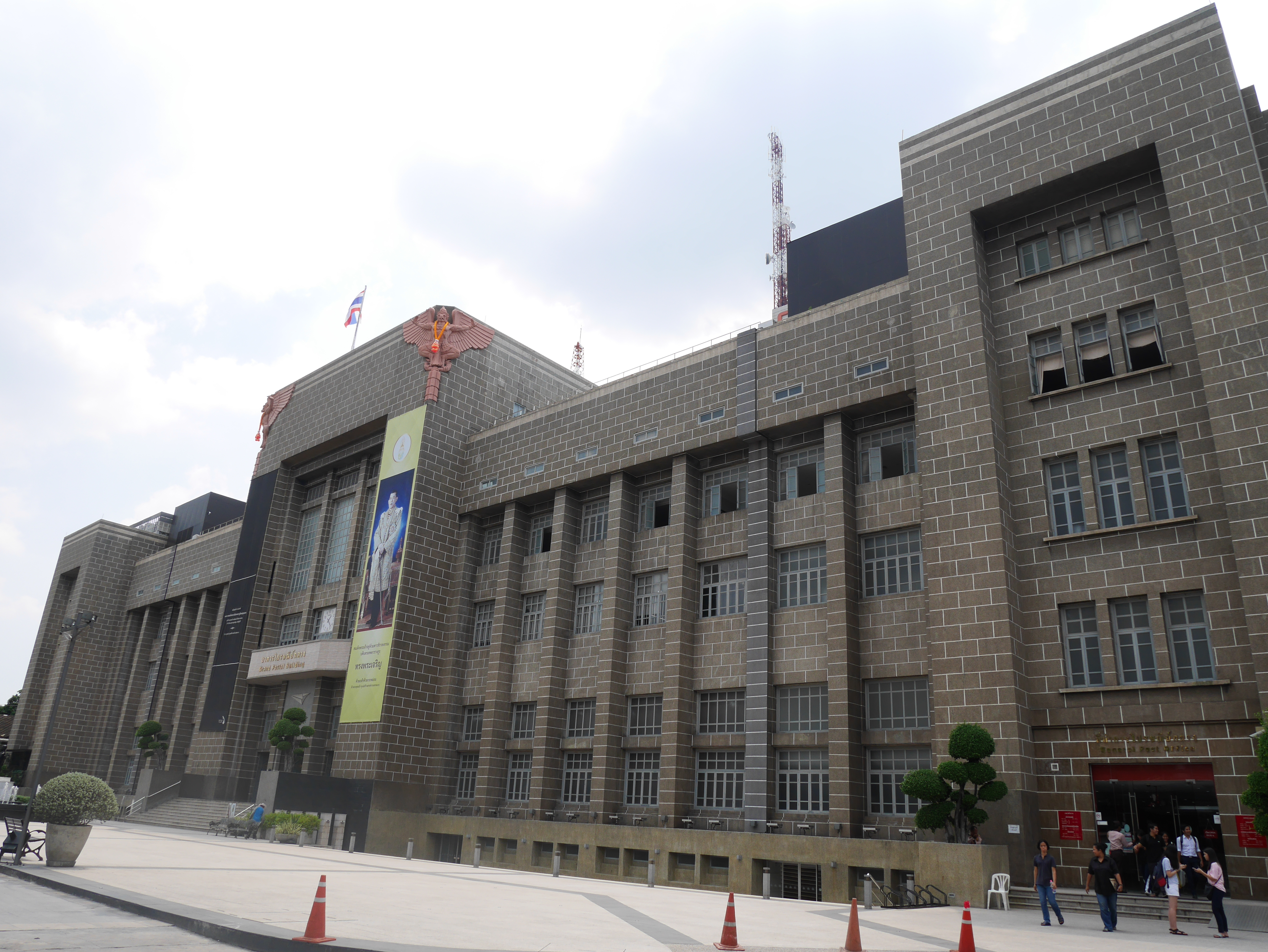
General Post Office building, headquarters of the TCDC

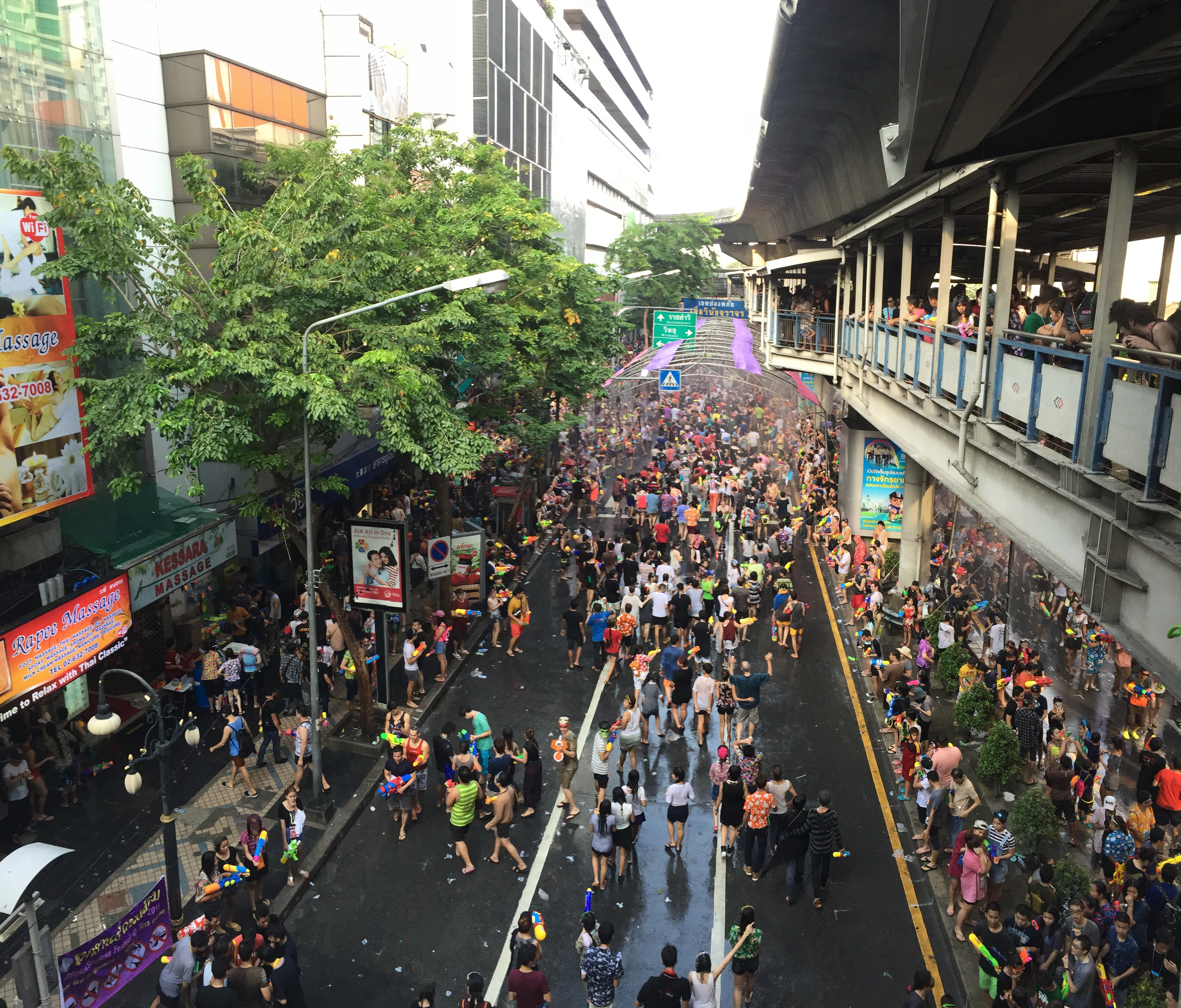
Songkran Festival on Si Lom Road

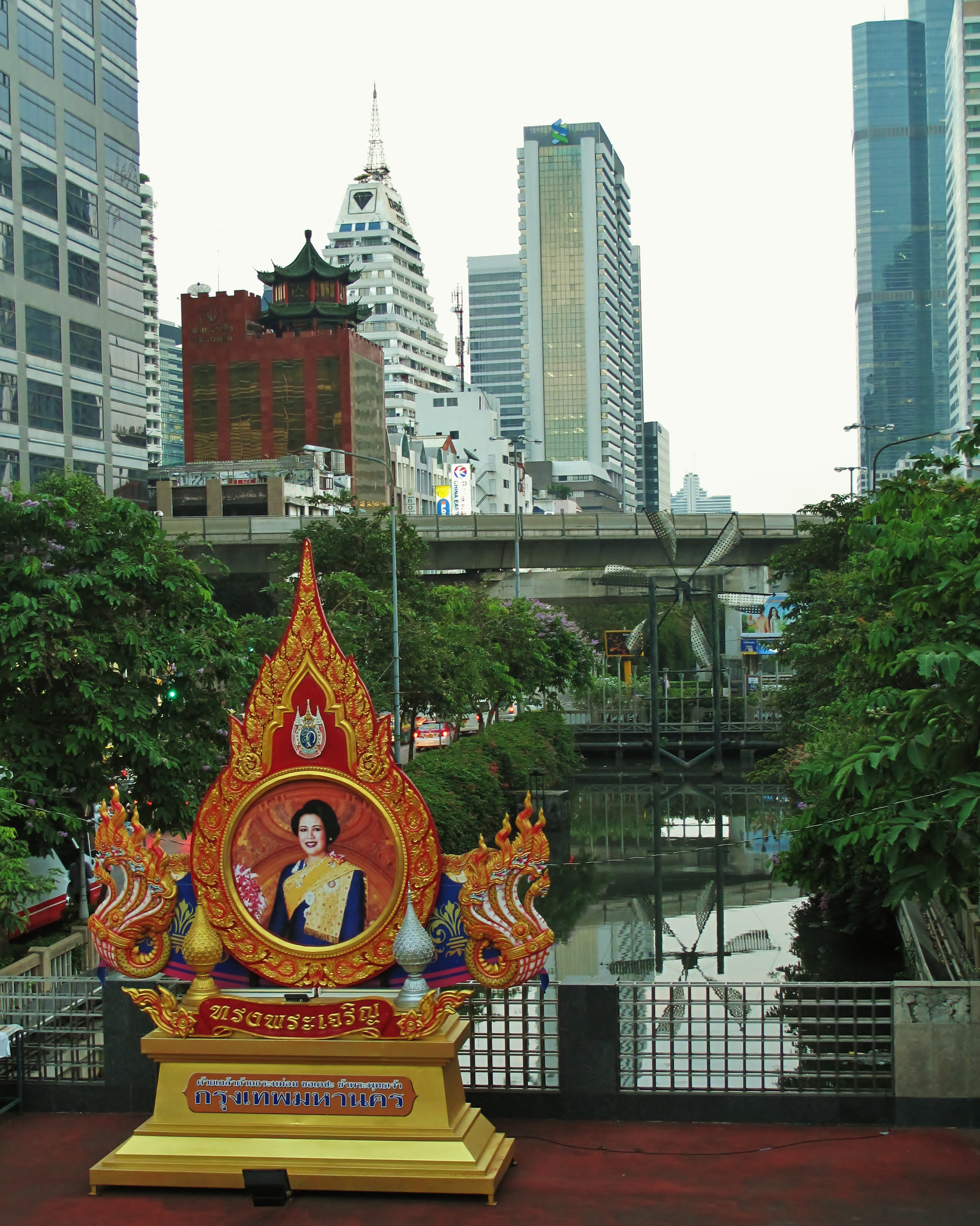
Si Lom–Naradhiwas Intersection

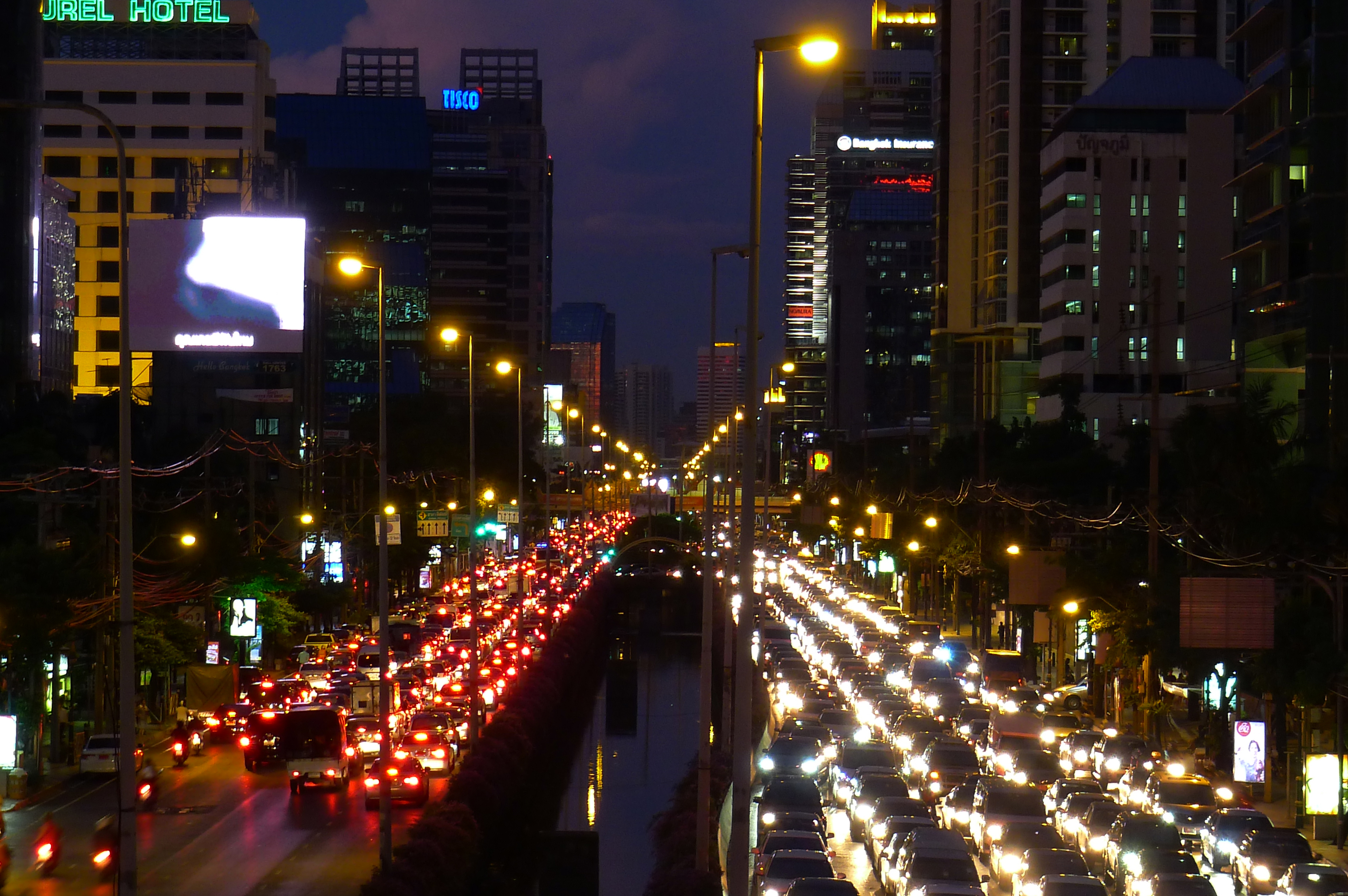
Rush-hour traffic on Sathon Road. (Bang Rak district is shown on the left side.)

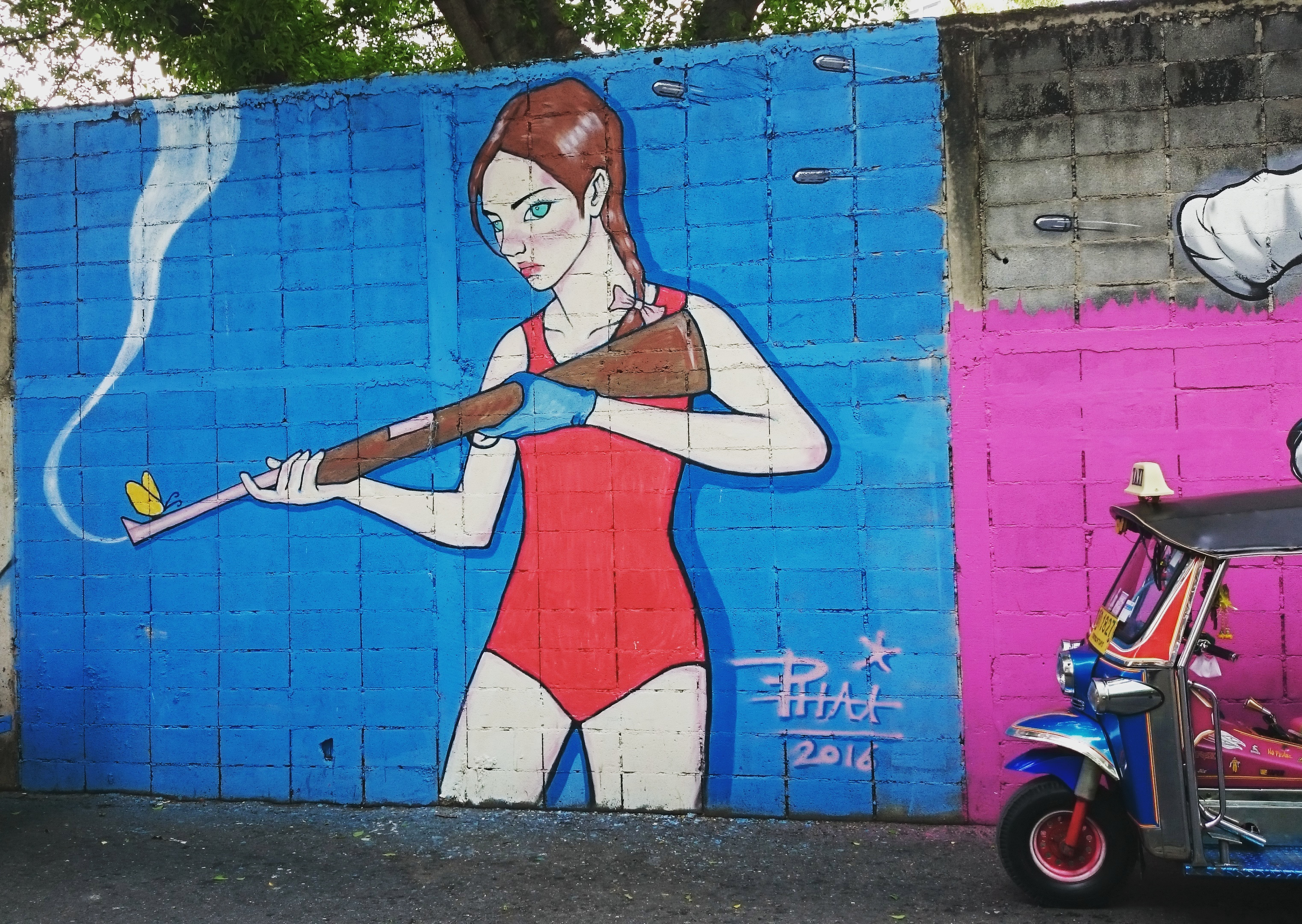
Street Art in Charoen Krung Soi 32
