= Wang Mai =

Wang Mai may refer to:

- Wang Mai, one of the Thai names of Windsor Palace (Bangkok)
- Wang Mai Subdistrict in Pathum Wan District, Bangkok
- Wang Mai Subdistrict in Mueang Chumphon District
- Wang Mai Subdistrict in Pa Bon District, Phatthalung Province
- Wang Mai Subdistrict in Wang Sombun District, Sa Kaeo Province
