= Haroon Mosque =

Mosque in Bang Rak, Bangkok, Thailand

- มัสยิดฮารูณ
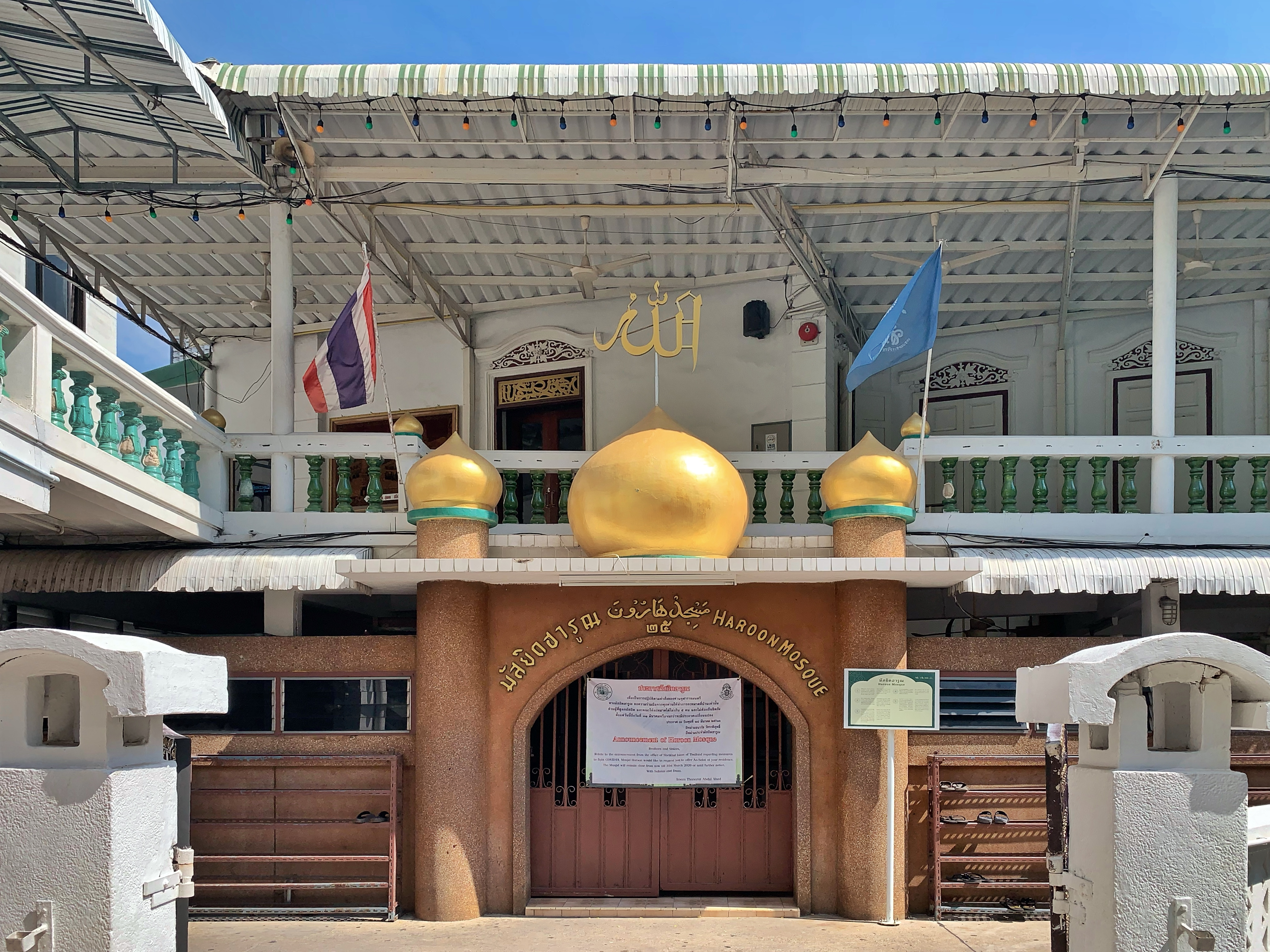

Religion
- Affiliation: Islam

Location
- Municipality: Bangkok
- Country: Thailand
- Interactive map of Haroon Mosque
- Coordinates: 13°43′32″N 100°30′52″E

Architecture
- Type: mosque
- Funded by: Musa Bafadel
- Established: 1837

Haroon Mosque, or Masjid Haroon (Thai: มัสยิดฮารูณ), is a mosque in Bang Rak, Bangkok, Thailand. It was founded in 1837 by Musa Bafadel, an Indonesian-Arab trader from Pontianak, Borneo, and named after his son, Haroon. Originally built in wood on the banks of the Chao Phraya River, the mosque was relocated about 500 metres inland during the reign of King Rama V in 1899 when the government constructed a customs house at the pier, and the community was given a larger plot of land for the new site. In 1934 the wooden structure was replaced with the present two-storey building, influenced by European townhouse design with neo-classical floral motifs, Romanesque pillars, and wooden shutters. The present two-storey structure continues to serve local worshippers and visitors, and the mosque is also known for hosting a halal food festival.
