= Phitthaya Sathian Bridge =

Phitthaya Sathian Bridge สะพานพิทยเสถียร
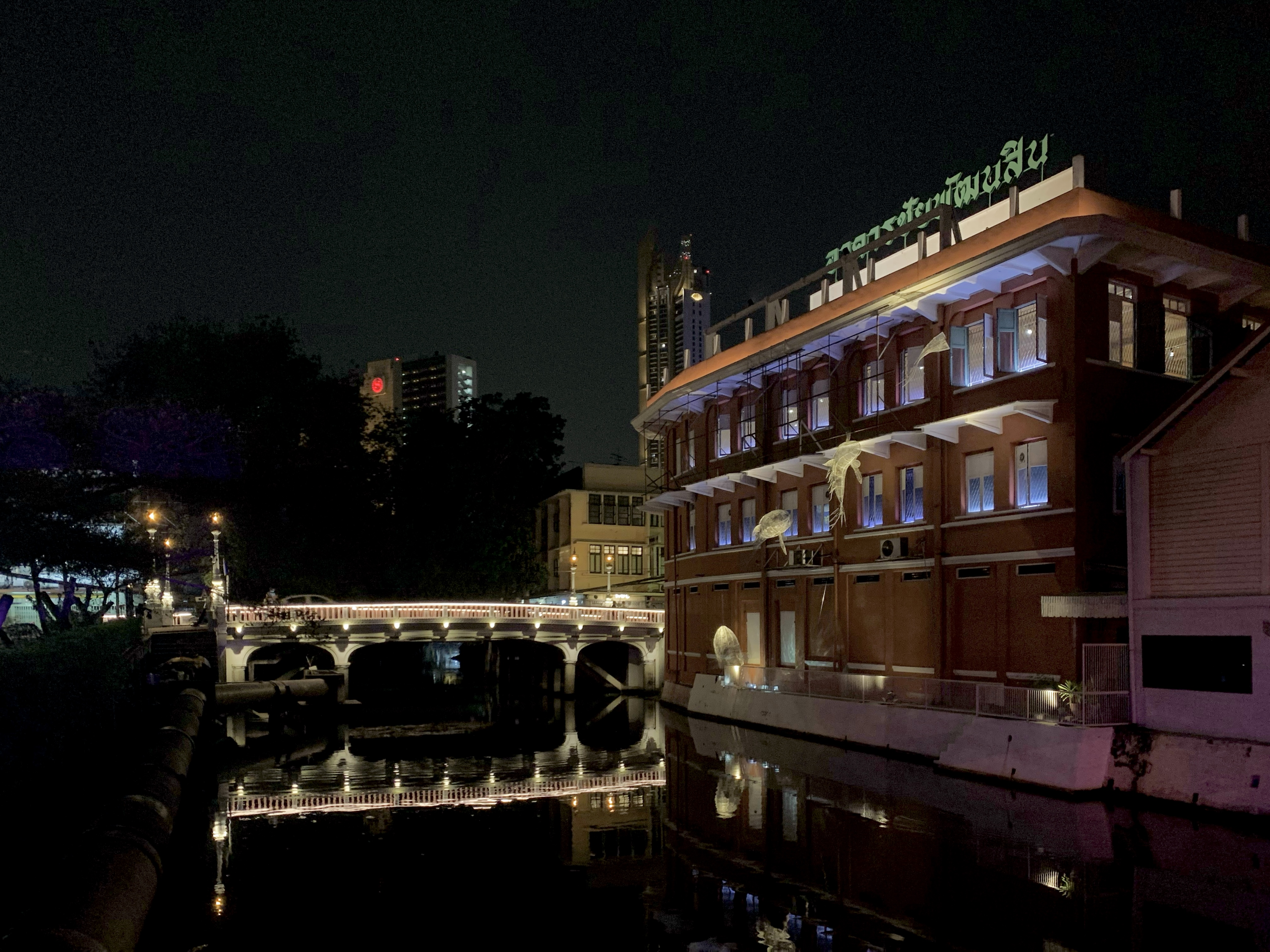
- Phitthaya Sathian Bridge and the Chai Phatthanasilp Building as seen from Khlong Phadung Krung Kasem
- Coordinates: 13°43′54.66″N 100°30′54.66″E
- Carries: Charoen Krung Road
- Crosses: Khlong Phadung Krung Kasem
- Locale: Samphanthawong and Bang Rak Districts, Bangkok, Thailand
- Official name: Phitthaya Sathian Bridge
- Other name: Saphan Lek Lang (Lower Steel Bridge)
- Maintained by: Bangkok Metropolitan Administration (BMA)

Characteristics
- Design: Venetian Gothic

Location
- Interactive map of Phitthaya Sathian Bridge

Phitthaya Sathian Bridge (Thai: สะพานพิทยเสถียร, RTGS: Saphan Phitthayasatthian, pronounced [sa.pʰāːn pʰít.thá.já.sà.tʰîan]) is a historic bridge in Bangkok. It is considered another of the city's notable steel bridges, alongside the Damrong Sathit Bridge, which is popularly known as Saphan Lek and located in the Khlong Thom area. Phitthaya Sathian Bridge spans Charoen Krung Road over Khlong Phadung Krung Kasem, marking the boundary between Talat Noi sub-district of Samphanthawong District and Maha Phruettharam and Bang Rak sub-districts of Bang Rak District.

The original structure, built during the reign of King Mongkut (Rama IV), was made of steel and could be separated in the middle to allow boats to pass, functioning similarly to a lifting bridge. This design gave rise to its nickname "Saphan Lek" (lit. 'steel bridge'). It was commonly referred to as "Saphan Lek Lang" (สะพานเหล็กล่าง, [sa.pʰāːn lɛ̀k lâːŋ], lit. 'Lower Steel Bridge'), while Damrong Sathit Bridge was known as "Saphan Lek Bon" (สะพานเหล็กบน, [sa.pʰāːn lɛ̀k bon]), lit. 'Upper Steel Bridge'). (Note: Because it is located near the beginning of the road.)

Later, during the reign of King Chulalongkorn (Rama V), the bridge was restored in 1899 and completed in 1900. At that time, it was given the official name "Phitthaya Sathian" in honour of Prince Sonabandit, who owned the nearby Wang Talat Noi palace.

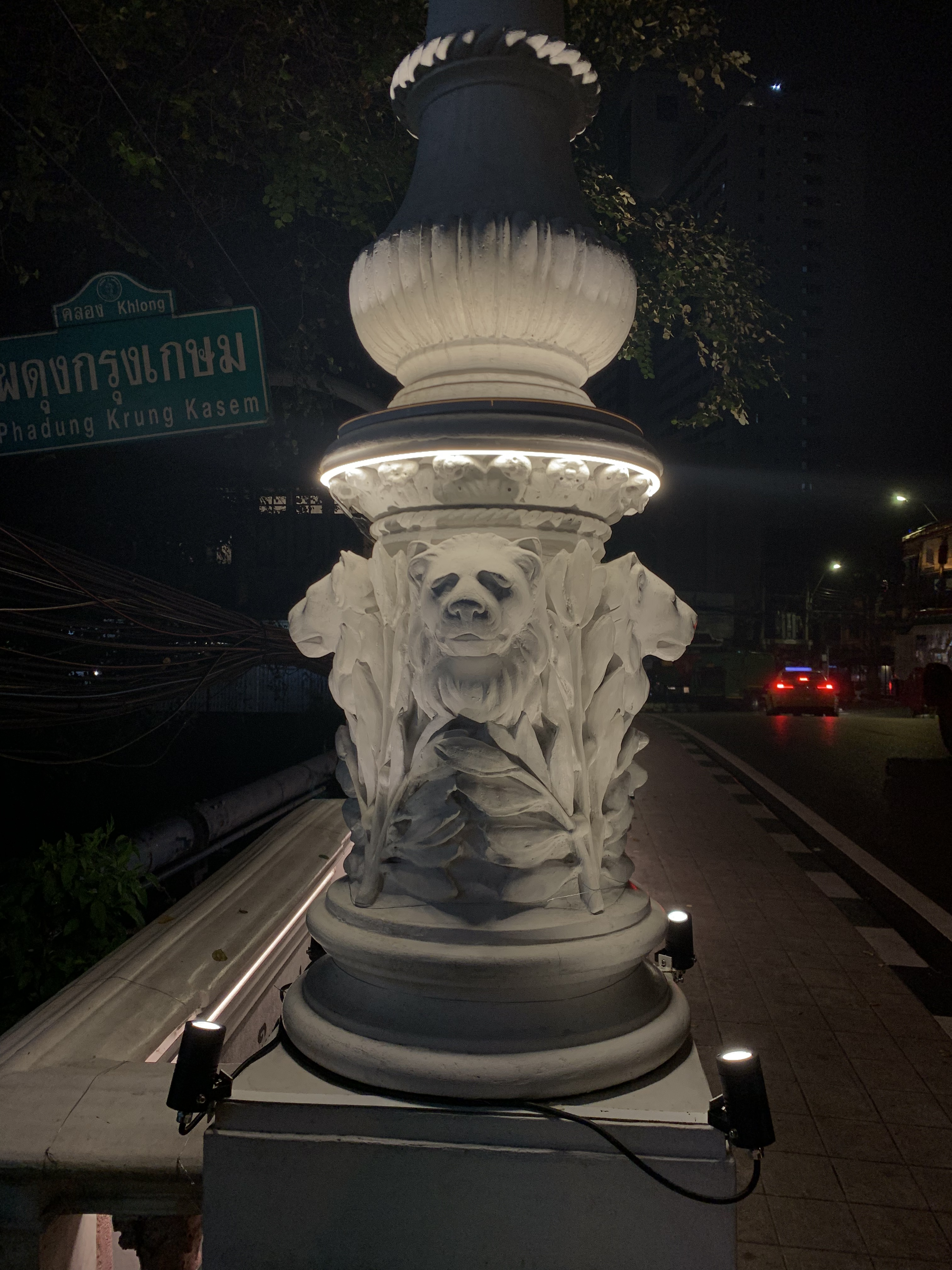
One of the lion head sculptures

Under King Vajiravudh (Rama VI), the bridge was restored again. It remains in that condition today. The structure is made of reinforced concrete and showcases beautiful Venetian Gothic architecture. Its lower beam is gracefully curved. The bridge features exquisite decorative elements, especially the balustrades, all eight lampposts, and the lion head sculptures at both ends.

Since 1975, Phitthaya Sathian Bridge, along with Damrong Sathit Bridge, has been officially recognized as a historic monument by the Fine Arts Department.

== See also ==
- Damrong Sathit Bridge
