= Mahapruttaram Girls' School =

School for girls in Thailand

Coordinates: 13.732449°N 100.515765°E

Mahapruttaram Girls' School (Thai: โรงเรียนสตรีวัดมหาพฤฒาราม) is a government funded secondary school for girls in Bangkok, Thailand. Presently, the school provides education for students from grade 7 through 12.

== History ==
Mahapruttaram Girls' School has been a vocational school for 30 years. In 1898 the Thai government gave money to improve the school. Then, it was opened as the Mahapruttaram girls' School on 12 December 1918. It opened a junior high school. It had 109 students and 3 teachers.

In 1955 Mahapruttaram Girls' School opened a senior high school which had both a science-mathematics program and a language-arts program. Prince Pitayalapoppruttiyakorn was the primary patron. The school is located at 519 Mahaprutaram Road. Mahaprutaram, Bangrak, Bangkok 10500.

In 1956 Queen Sirikit came to visit the school, privately and without ceremony. And in 1968, Queen Sirikit came to celebrate the school's fiftieth anniversary and created the Srimahaprutt Scholarship. She became patron of the school, calling it "Mahapruttaram Girls' School under the Royal Patronage of her Majesty the Queen".

== Notable alumni ==
- Sawalee Phakapan, National Artist
- Rosana Tositrakul, Bangkok Senator in 2008)
- Varunee Suesatsakulchai (Correspondent)
- Supachaya Luthisoponkul (Artist)
- Kasarin Aektawachkul (Actress)
- Lukana Huangmaneerungroj (Actress/Artist/DJ)
- Napapa Tantrakul (Actress)
- Angkana Triratanatip (Miss Thailand)
- Butree Perdpong (Olympic Taekwondo Athlete)
- Suwapich Tripornworakit (Actress)
- Pawadee Kumchokpaisan (Actress)
- Thanapa Saelao (National Taekwondo Athlete)
- Nutnisha Sherdshubupakaree (Actress)

== Curriculum ==
The school provides education from grades 7 through 12. Each grade has 10 rooms. Students are required to choose one of the following programs of study:

- Science-Mathematics
- English-Mathematics
- Chinese-English
- French-English
- Business-English
