= Sawalee Pakaphan =

Thai singer and actress

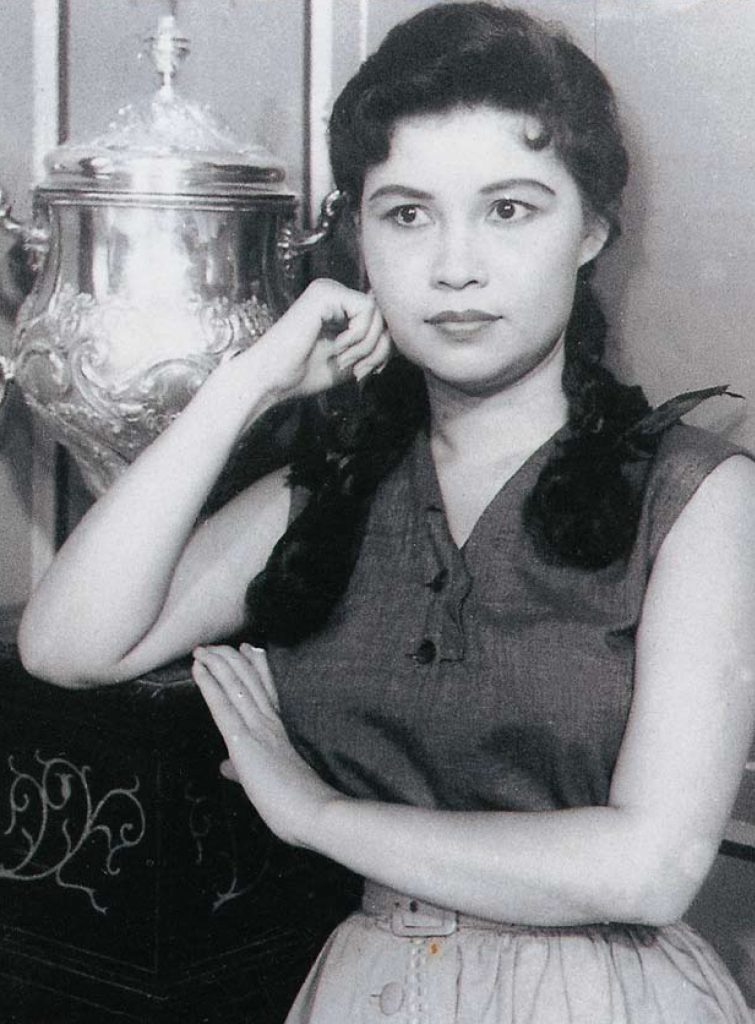
Sawalee Pakaphan

Sawalee Pakaphan (Thai: สวลี ผกาพันธุ์; 6 August 1931 – 1 May 2018) was a Thai Luk Krung singer and actress. Sawalee has recorded more than 2,000 songs. She is nicknamed the “Queen of Luk Krung” and is considered a revered figure in the Luk Krung music industry. Sawalee is considered a pioneering actress in the Thai film industry and was the first actress to play the role of "Pojaman Sawangwong" in the stage play Ban Sai Thong. She received the most Golden Record Awards (3 times) (4 songs) and is the first singer to be honored as a National Artist in the Performing Arts (Thai Pop Songs - Singing) in 1989.

== Early life ==
Sawalee Pakaphan was born on August 6, 1931.at Bangkok, her birth name was Sherry Hoffmann.

== Death ==
Sawalee Pakaphan died from choking on drugs and suffocation at her home at 8:00 p.m. on May 1, 2018. She was 86 years, 8 months, and 24 days old.
