= Anglican Church in Thailand =

The Anglican Church in Thailand (ACT) is a deanery of the Diocese of Singapore within the Province of South East Asia. It is in communion with other members of the worldwide Anglican Communion.

ACT began with the Parish of Christ Church Bangkok. From 1991 onwards, new daughter churches and ministries were planted, as part of a process of growing to becoming a diocese of Thailand.

== History ==
=== English Language ===
On 26 July 1861, at the request of a group of mostly British non-Roman Catholic Christians, King Mongkut granted land near the Protestant Cemetery on the Chao Phraya River to the “Community of foreigners who are of Protestant Christian faith” to be used for a church building. The "Protestant Union Chapel" or informally the "English Church" opened for worship on 1 May 1864. Except during 1869 -1892, when services were mostly of a Presbyterian nature, services were conducted according to the Anglican rite.

On 16 February 1896, George Hose, Anglican Bishop of Singapore, Labuan and Sarawak conducted the first confirmation in the chapel.

On 7 April 1904, King Chulalongkorn granted permission to sell the river site and gave land off North Sathorn Road for the erection of a new church. The new church, named “Christ Church”, was dedicated on 30 April 1905.

Christ Church Bangkok was upgraded from a Chaplaincy to become a Parish of the Diocese of Singapore in 1963 when the Archdeacon of North Malaya, on behalf of the Bishop of Singapore, instituted and inducted J. E. Ironside as the first vicar.

Numerous English-speakers have worshipped at Christ Church including Elizabeth II and Margaret Thatcher.

=== Thai Language ===
Worship in Thai began during the years 1934–1940 using a prayer book translated by C. W. Norwood with the help of Thai nationals, but it was more than fifty years before the church was able to find a Thai-speaking clergyman.

In 1991, Gerry Khoo was appointed as assistant priest. The first meeting of a Thai congregation was attended by seven people in a small conference room. Since then the Thai congregation has grown markedly.

The Rainbowland Child Development Centre, a ministry of the Thai congregation, opened at Christ Church in 1998.

There has also been a massive expansion of the church in other parts of Thailand. Christ Church Banchang was established in 1996. Christ Church Sawang Daendin was established in 1999. A Church was planted in Korat Province in 2002.

== Registration ==
The Anglican Church in Thailand was registered with the Evangelical Fellowship of Thailand on 9 May 1994.
