= Wang Mai Subdistrict, Bangkok =

Wang Mai วังใหม่
- Khwaeng
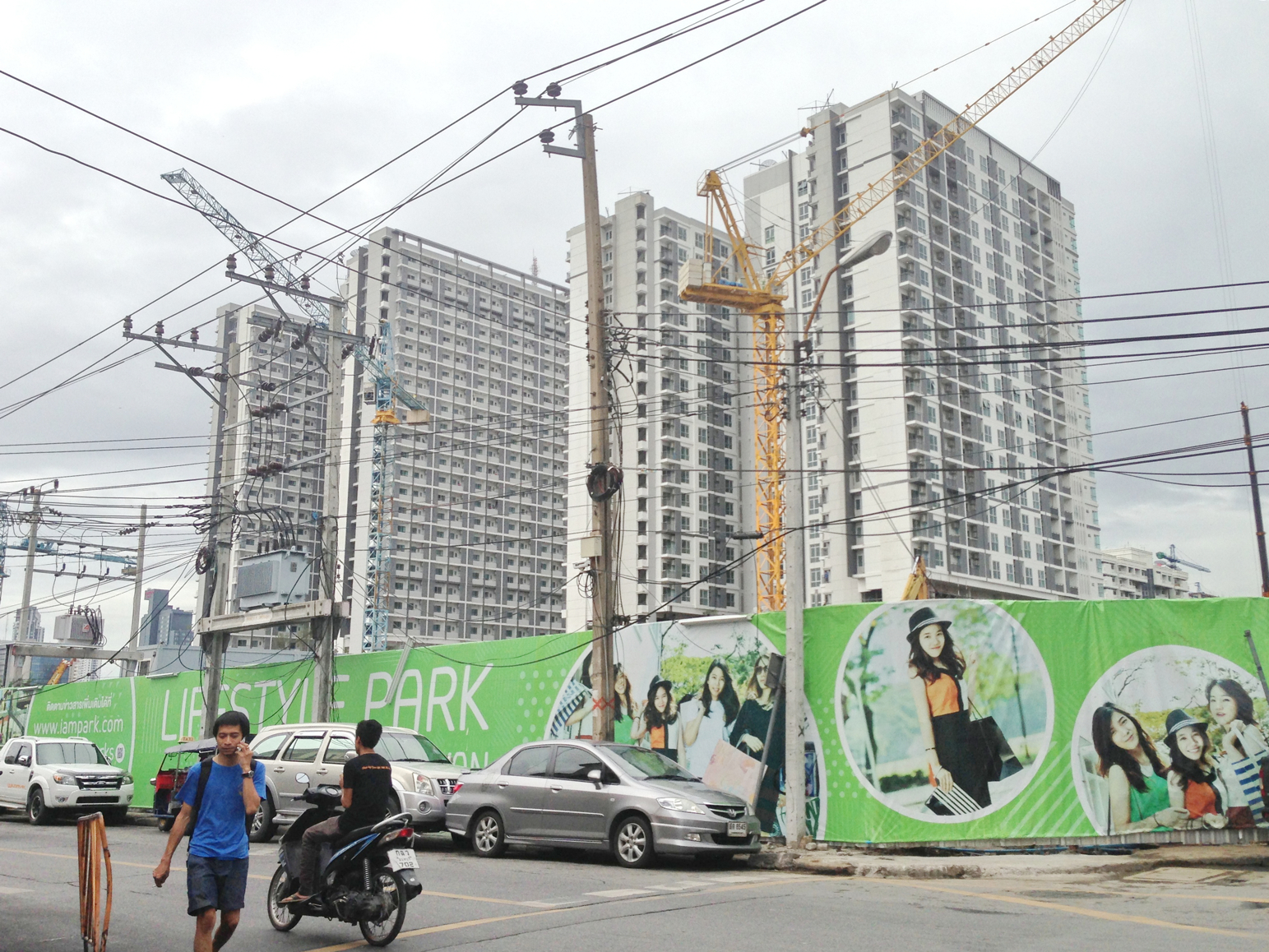
- Krua Suan Luang, located in Wang Mai Subdistrict.

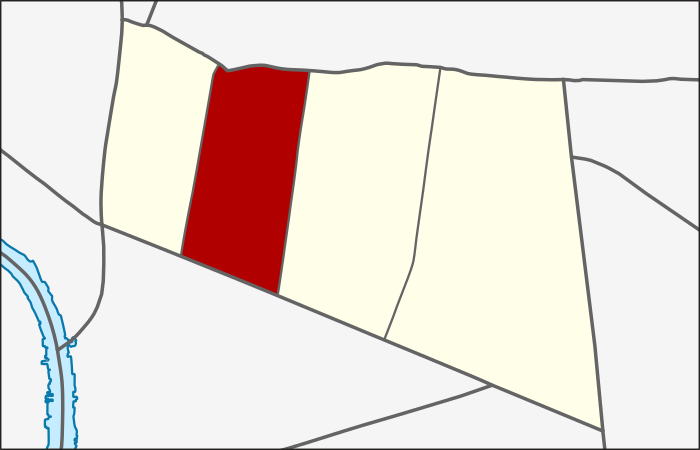
- Location in Pathum Wan District
- Country: Thailand
- Province: Bangkok
- Khet: Bang Khen

Area
  - Total: 1.423 km^{2} (0.549 sq mi)

Population (2019)
  - Total: 6,805
- Time zone: UTC+7 (ICT)
- Postal code: 10330, 10110, 10120, 10500, 10400
- TIS 1099: 100702

Wang Mai (Thai: วังใหม่, pronounced [waŋ mǎj]) is a khwaeng (subdistrict) of Pathum Wan, Bangkok. In 2019, it had a population of 6,805.
