= O.P. Place =

Shopping centre and historic building in Bangkok

Coordinates: 13°43′28″N 100°30′56″E

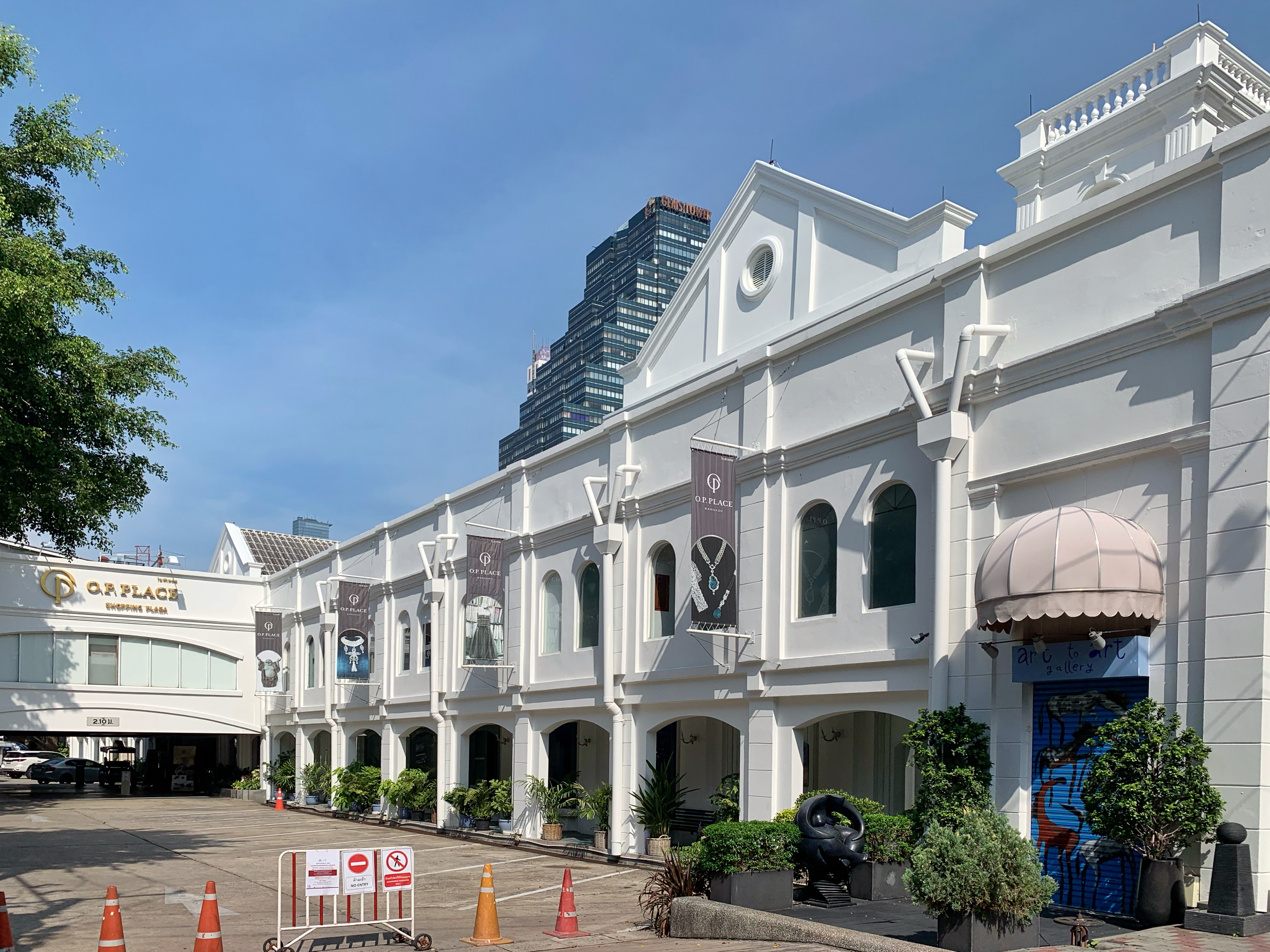
O.P. Place in 2020

O.P. Place is a shopping centre housed in a historic building in the Bang Rak neighbourhood of the Thai capital Bangkok. The building was built in 1908 as the premises of Falck & Beidek, and was known to locals as Hang Sing Toh (Thai: ห้างสิงห์โต 'lion store'). It later became the Oriental Plaza, before its acquisition by the current owners. Today, its merchandise is focused on upscale antiques and collectibles, and the neoclassical building is recognized for its heritage architecture, having received the ASA Architectural Conservation Award in 1982.

== History ==
The building that currently houses O.P. Place was built in 1908 as the new premises of the store of Falck and Beidek, who had been in business since 1878. It was among the largest department stores in the city, and was known to locals as Hang Sing Toh, meaning 'lion store', for a pair of lion sculptures that used to stand in front of the building.

The 1908 publication Twentieth Century Impressions of Siam describes the business as follows:

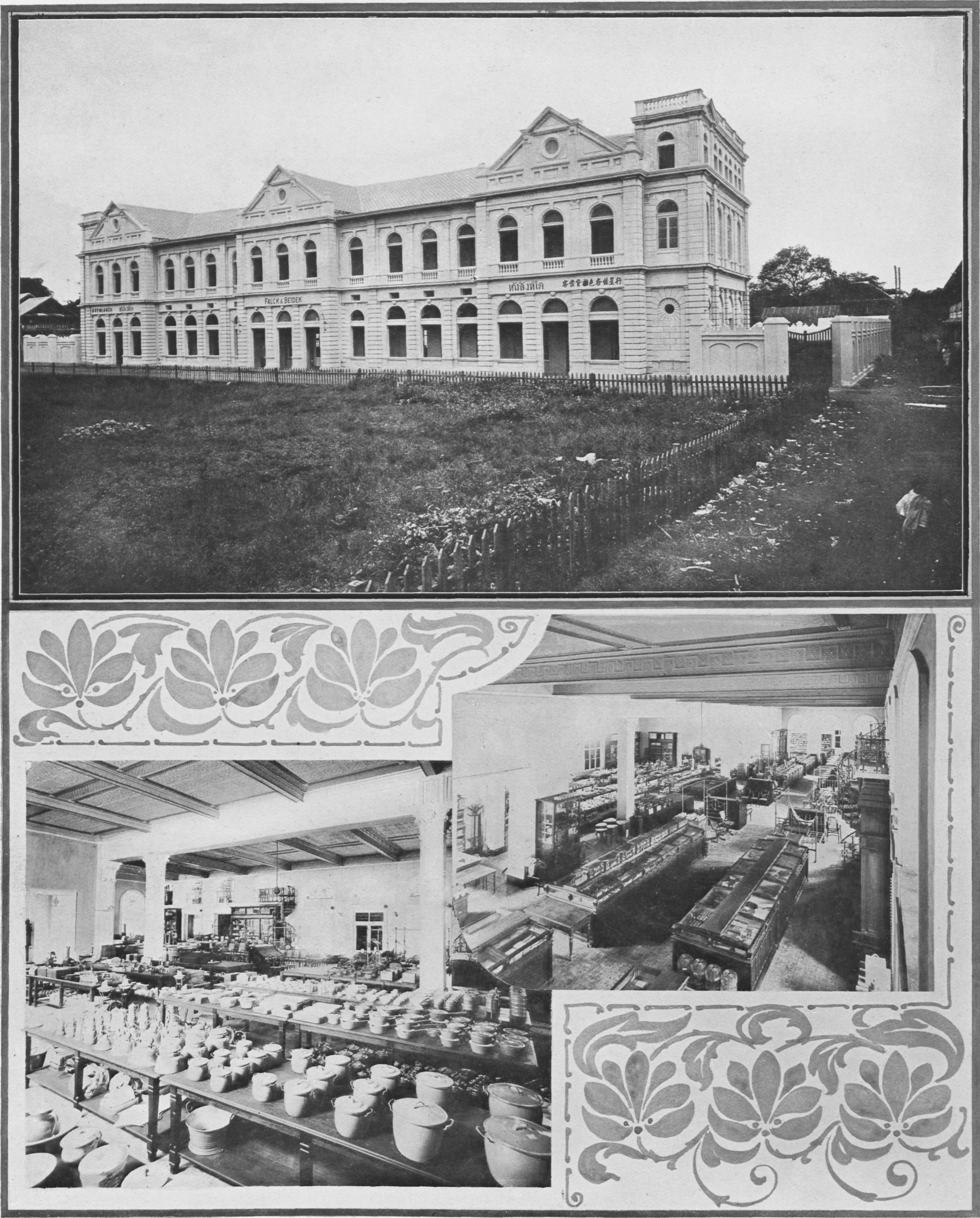
Premises and showrooms of Messrs. Falck & Beidek, from Twentieth Century Impressions of Siam

It is no exaggeration to say that practically everything which a resident in Bangkok needs, with the exception, perhaps, of piece goods, may be purchased from Messrs. Falck and Beidek, a firm of importers and wholesale and retail merchants who have been firmly established in Siam now for some thirty years past. The business was founded in 1878 by Messrs. Falck, Bramann, and Beidek, and has, since its inception, been known by the Hong name of "Hang Sing Toh." Some idea of the extent of the trade carried on by the firm and the resources at their command may be gathered from the size of their new premises, which are situated on an extensive piece of ground just off the New Road, and adjoining their old site, which will shortly be occupied by the Chartered Bank's building now in course of erection. Their premises form, undoubtedly, the finest business house in Bangkok. The whole of the material used in their construction was imported from abroad, even to the very bricks. They are absolutely fireproof, and are so arranged that every facility is given for the effective display of the goods. The building is three storeys high on each side and two storeys high in the centre, so that, including the godowns, the amount of floor space at disposal altogether is something like 35,000 feet. The house, both in regard to its size and the wide range of selection provided by the amount of stock, compares favourably with any of the leading stores in either Singapore or Pinang. Hardware, stationery, furniture, safes, machinery, pumps, machine fittings, china, glass, crockery, trunks, travellers' requisites, fancy goods, typewriters, duplicators, bicycles, clocks, and many other articles, all come within the scope of the enterprise. These goods are imported direct from the leading houses in Europe and America, and the name and standing of the firm are sufficiently high, in themselves, to guarantee their quality.

Mr. Ch. Kramer, who has been a partner of the firm since 1896, has been connected with the business for the last twenty years. New premises were built under his supervision, and according to instructions founded on his long observation of the requirements of the trade in Bangkok.

The business closed down during World War I, when Siam declared war against Germany and seized the properties of its citizens. The building afterwards changed hands several times. By the 1980s, it had become known as the Oriental Plaza and operated as an upmarket shopping centre selling antiques, art objects and handicrafts. It was acquired by TCC Group in the 2000s, after which it was renamed as O.P. Place.

== Architecture ==
O.P. Place stands on Soi Charoen Krung 38, near its sister property O.P. Garden and the Mandarin Oriental Hotel, occupying an area in the historic Bang Rak neighbourhood featuring several European heritage buildings. The building was built in 1908 in the neoclassical style, with arched window arcades in two storeys spanning the length of its wide façade, which is decorated with mouldings, superimposed pilasters and rusticated walls. Three gabled porches accentuate the form of the rectangular building, which received the ASA Architectural Conservation Award in 1982. A historic birdcage elevator and large chandelier dominate the interior, which houses 59 boutiques, and is also used as an event space.
