= Vichit Mukura =

Vichit Mukura (Thai: วิชิต มุกุระ; RTGS: Wichit Mukura) is a Thai chef specialized in royal Thai cuisine, currently serving as executive chef at Royal Osha. Vichit previously served as executive chef at Sala Rim Nam at the Mandarin Oriental Bangkok for almost 30 years

== Early life and education ==
Vichit was born in Pattaya, Chonburi province.

== Career ==
Vichit was responsible for curating the state dinner menu for Barack Obama during his 2012 visit to Thailand, hosted by Prime Minister Yingluck Shinawatra.

Vichit previously operated Chef's Table by Khao, a 12-seat restaurant serving Thai cuisine using Japanese produce.
