= FTCC =

FTCC may refer to:

- Fayetteville Technical Community College, North Carolina, United States
- Franco-Thai Chamber of Commerce
