= Bang Rak subdistrict =

Coordinates: 13°43′30″N 100°30′55″E

Bang Rak บางรัก
- Khwaeng
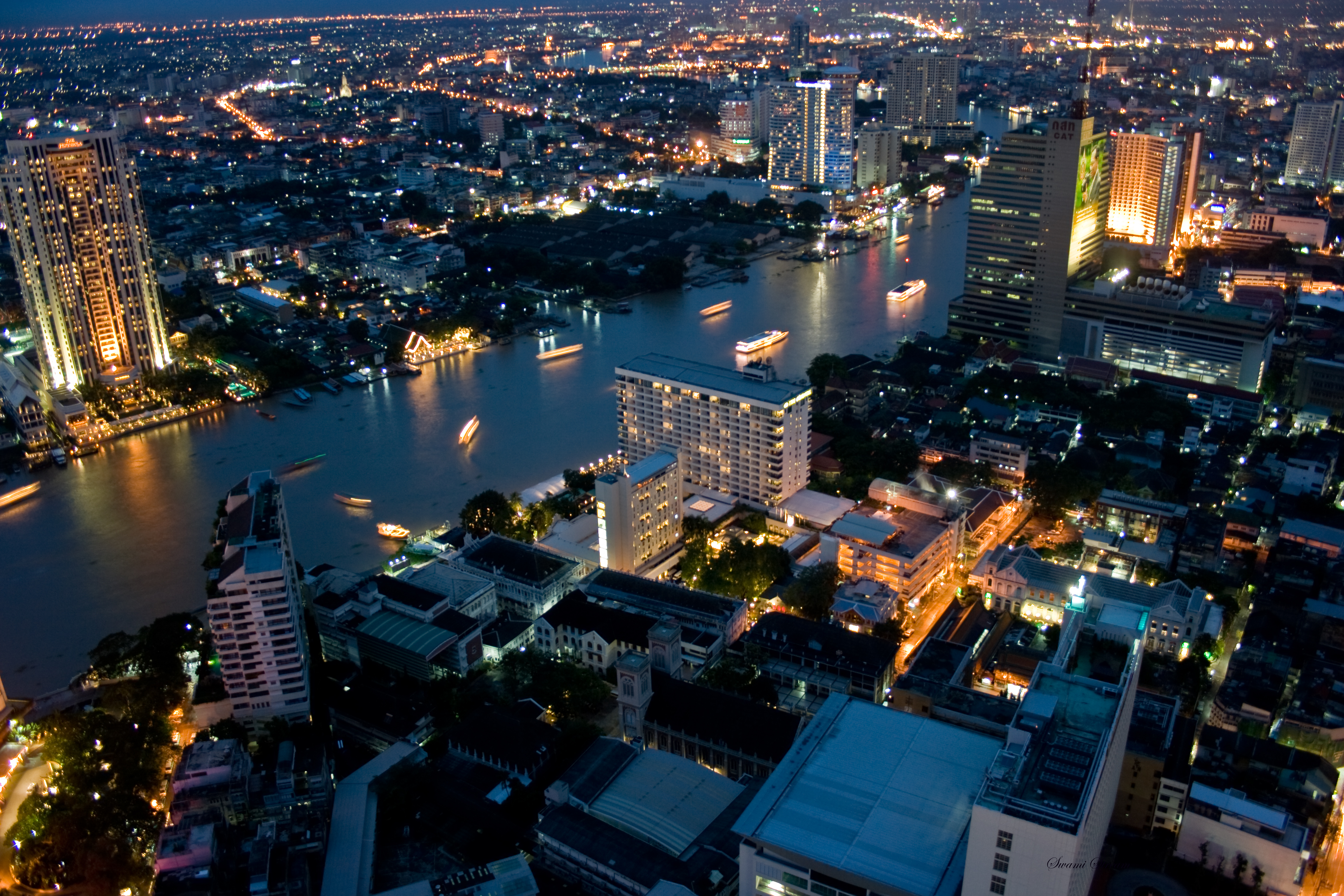
- Night view showing the Bang Rak area on the near side of the river
- Interactive map of Bang Rak
- Country: Thailand
- Province: Bangkok
- Khet: Bang Rak

Area
  - Total: 0.689 km^{2} (0.266 sq mi)

Population (2020)
  - Total: 2,672
- Time zone: UTC+7 (ICT)
- Postal code: 10500
- TIS 1099: 100404

Bang Rak (Thai: บางรัก, pronounced [bāːŋ rák]) is a khwaeng (subdistrict) and historic neighbourhood in Bangkok's Bang Rak District. It lies between the Chao Phraya River and Charoen Krung Road, and was home to communities of European expatriates who settled in the area mostly during the second half of the 19th century as Siam (as Thailand was then known) opened up to the West. Among them were the Portuguese, French and British, whose embassies occupied extensive grounds in the area, Danes who founded shipping companies as well as the historic Oriental Hotel, and Catholic missionaries who established some of the first schools in the country on the grounds surrounding Assumption Cathedral.

Bang Rak was among the city's busiest commercial neighbourhoods at the turn of the 19th–20th centuries, but declined in prominence as newer development soon moved elsewhere. Beginning in the 2010s, urban revitalization efforts have led the area to become known as the Charoenkrung Creative District, a project led by the Thailand Creative & Design Center, which re-established its headquarters at the Grand Postal Building in 2017.

== History ==
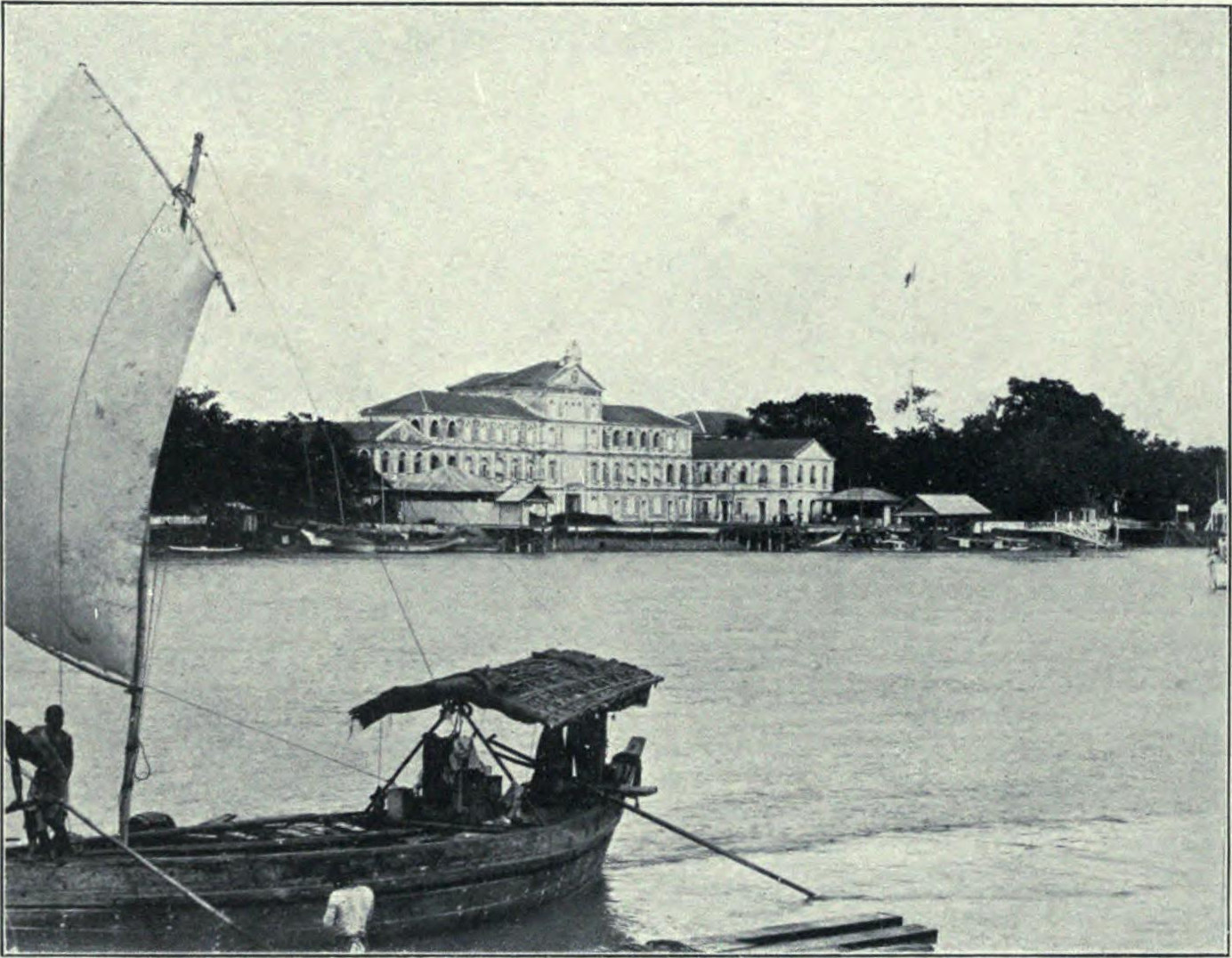
The Customs House formed an imposing edifice on the riverbank around the turn of the 19th–20th centuries

When Bangkok became capital of the Rattanakosin Kingdom in 1782, fringe communities developed outside its city walls, mainly along the banks of the Chao Phraya River. Downstream of the walled city beyond the Chinese community of Sampheng, the river's eastern bank became home to several ethnic communities, including Portuguese and Chinese Catholics centred around the Holy Rosary Church, Malays, and Vietnamese refugees led by the future Emperor Gia Long. The area gradually attracted European visitors, beginning with French Catholic missionaries, who eventually took over the management of the church. They also founded a new church (later to become the Assumption Cathedral) some distance further south in 1822, and based their mission offices there. They were followed by Protestants, mainly Americans, in the 1830s. Portugal was the first foreign nation to establish a consulate in the capital, having been granted a piece of land in the area in 1820.

When King Mongkut (Rama IV) ascended the throne in 1851, the city had grown beyond its original walls, and Khlong Phadung Krung Kasem was dug in 1852 to extend the city's periphery. The canal separated the riverside communities, with the Chinese neighbourhood of Talat Noi on the city side, and the Portuguese Consulate and Assumption Church on the other, which later became known as Bang Rak. The origins of the name are unclear, though two prevailing theories posit that it derived either from that of the rak (Gluta usitata) tree, a large trunk of which had been found in the area, or from the word rak (รักษ์ 'heal'), after hospitals operated by the area's missionaries. Western communities were encouraged to settle here, and consulates were established in the area as Siam signed trade treaties with European powers, beginning with the British, whose consulate was built next to Portugal's in 1857. The French followed soon after. Charoen Krung Road, the country's first modern road, was built to serve the area in 1862, following a petition by the consuls.

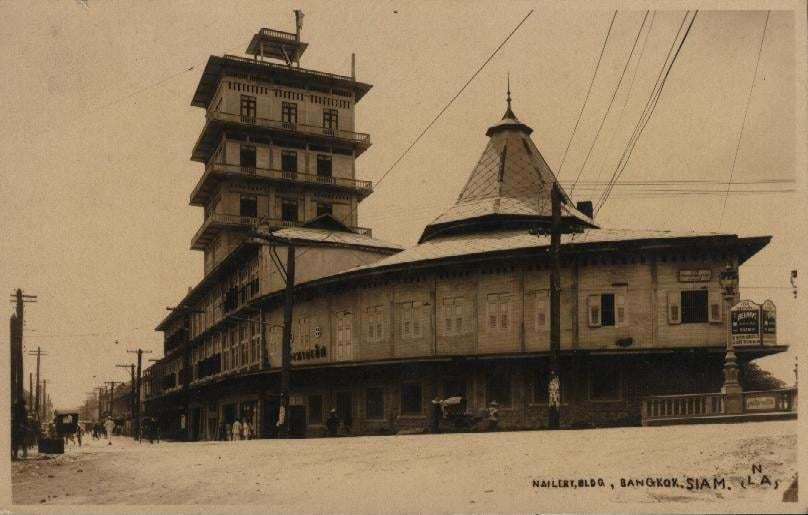
Nai Lert's seven-storey commercial complex, built in 1927, was the city's tallest building at the time.

The advent of land-based transport transformed the city, and Charoen Krung Road became its first main thoroughfare. As the country continued to modernize under Mongkut's successor King Chulalongkorn (Rama V, r. 1868–1910), Western values became expressed through the architecture of public and private buildings. In Bang Rak, several were built in various Western styles from the late-18th to early-19th centuries, including the Customs House and the original building of Assumption College (one of the first schools in the country, founded by the Catholic Mission), both completed in grand Palladian style in 1890. Many private enterprises were established in the area, including the famous luxury hotel the Oriental. By the turn of the century, Bang Rak had become a busy commercial hub in addition to Bangkok's main expatriate neighbourhood, a busy conglomeration of residences, shops, diplomatic and business offices, as well as rice mills, sawmills, warehouses and a harbour.

Bang Rak's economic prominence gradually declined as newer development shifted elsewhere during the 20th century. In the 21st century, increasing interest in cultural tourism led to a renewed interest in the architectural and historic sites of Bang Rak and neighbouring Talat Noi. The 2010s saw the neighbourhood become the focus of urban revitalization efforts aiming to revive the area as a creative district. Galleries, public artworks, and "hip" cafes are now scattered throughout the neighbourhood. The project is supported by the Thailand Creative & Design Center, which re-established its headquarters at the Grand Postal Building (built in 1940 on the former site of the British consulate) in 2017, though concerns remain over the trend towards gentrification and the encroachment of development.

== Geography ==
Bang Rak Subdistrict occupies an elongated strip of land between Chao Phraya River to the west and Charoen Krung Road on the east. It is bounded by Khlong Phadung Krung Kasem to the north, across which lies the Talat Noi neighbourhood of Samphanthawong District, and Khlong Sathon to the south, across which is the district of Sathon. The other subdistricts of Bang Rak District—Maha Phruettharam, Si Phraya, Suriyawong and Si Lom—all border it on the east, while across the River lies Khlong San District. The subdistrict's area totals 0.689 square kilometres (0.266 sq mi).

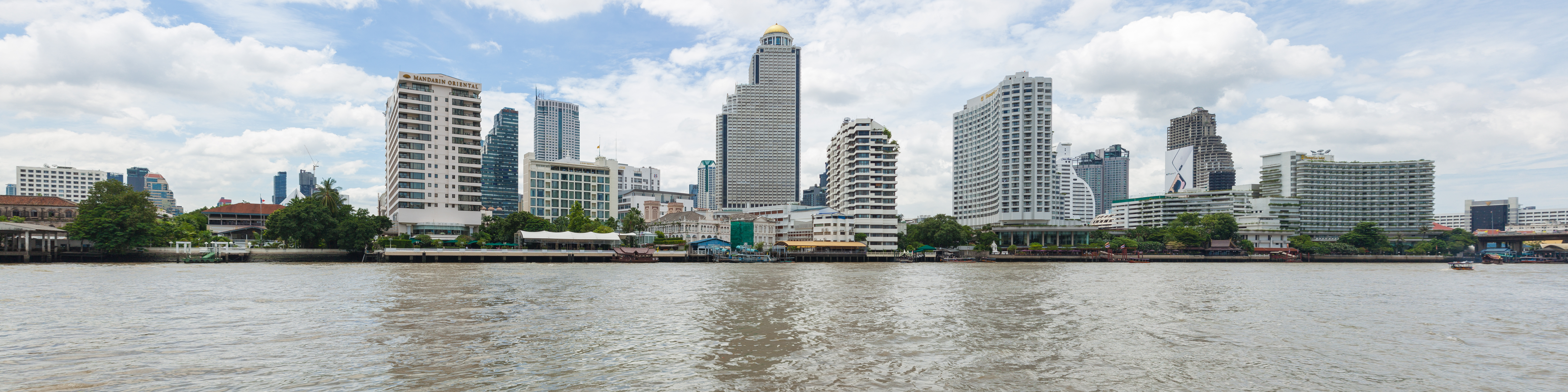
The Bang Rak waterfront

=== Neighbourhoods ===
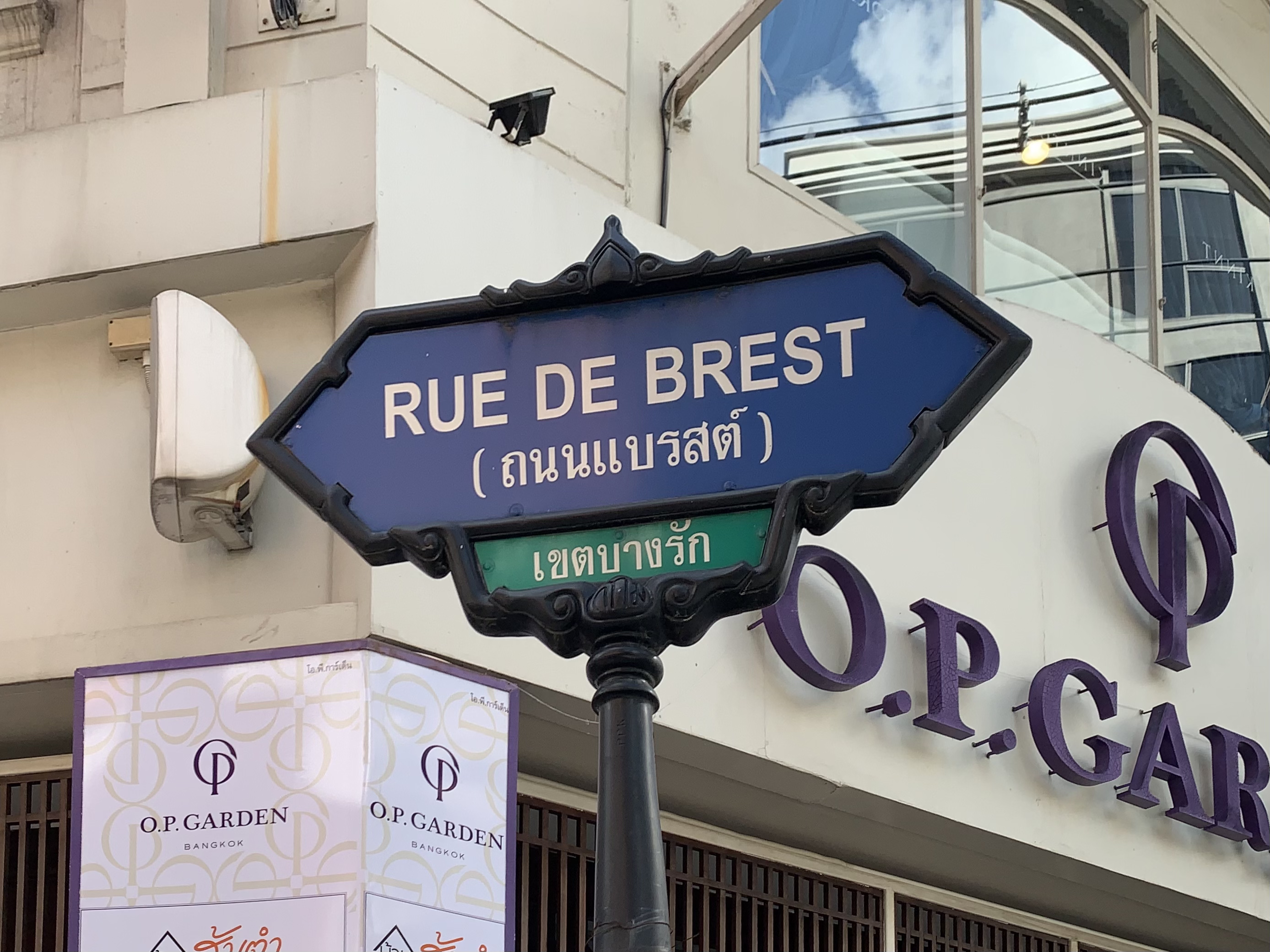
Rue de Brest, Bangkok

Bang Rak's multicultural history is reflected in its various historic and religious sites, which include Buddhist temples, mosques, a Chinese shrine, and the Catholic cathedral. The area's neighbourhoods are served by several side streets (soi) branching off Charoen Krung Road. They include the following, from north to south.

Soi Nai Loet
As Charoen Krung Road crosses Phitthayasathian Bridge into Bang Rak, it branches off to Soi Charoen Krung 26 (Soi 26 for short) and Soi 28, also known as Nai Loet 1 and 2 after the turn-of-the-century businessman Nai Lert, whose emporium used to front the road here. At seven storeys, it was the tallest building in the city at its opening in 1927.
Si Phraya and Captain Bush Lane
Near the northern end of the subdistrict is Si Phraya Road, which serves the same neighbourhood as Soi Charoen Krung 30 or Captain Bush Lane, where the Portuguese Embassy is located, along with the Royal Orchid Sheraton hotel and other historic buildings.
General Post Office and Wat Muang Khae
Continuing south, between Soi 32 and Soi 34 is the General Post Office or Grand Postal Building, which, along with the offices of CAT Telecom, sits on the former location of the British Embassy. Soi 34 serves the Buddhist temple Wat Muang Khae. The two streets are also known as Soi Praisani Klang (after the post office's Thai name) and Soi Wat Muang Khae, respectively.
Customs House
Soi 36 or Soi Rong Phasi ('Customs House Lane') is home to the historic Customs House building and Haroon Mosque, which serves an old Muslim community. The French Embassy is also located here, leading the street to be named "Rue de Brest" in 2013 to commemorate diplomatic relations, reciprocating Rue de Siam in the French city of Brest. O.P. Garden, occupying a corner at the soi's beginning, comprises a group of buildings that used to house the first polyclinic in Thailand, operated by the conservationist doctor Boonsong Lekagul. Today it features several shops, cafés and galleries.
Oriental
Soi 38 is also known as Chartered Bank Lane after the Chartered Bank of India, Australia and China, which was established here in 1894. The Falck & Beidek store, now known as O.P. Place, is still located here. Soi 40 or Soi Burapha, also known as Oriental Avenue, serves the Mandarin Oriental, Bangkok (as the Oriental is now known) and the East Asiatic Building (the former headquarters of the Danish East Asiatic Company), as well as the Catholic Mission, which operates the adjacent Assumption Cathedral, Assumption College boys' school, and Assumption Convent and Assumption Suksa girls' schools. Some of the mission offices occupy the former building of the Banque de l'Indochine, built in 1908.
Wat Suan Phlu
Soi 42 and Soi 42/1 serve Wat Suan Phlu, known for its historic teak houses, as well as the Shangri-La Hotel.
Bang Rak Market and Ban U
Towards the southern end of the subdistrict, Soi 44 (Talat Luang) and Soi 46 (Ban U) serve the Bang Rak Market and Ban Oou Mosque. The Bang Rak Market was established during Chulalongkorn's reign by the nobleman Luang Nawakenikon, who later sold it off to the state.
Taksin Bridge
Soi 50 (Keson) is the last street before Charoen Krung Road crosses Sathon. On its corner is a branch of Robinson Department Store. The Hainanese Chiao Eng Biao Shrine faces the terminal end of Sathon Road, above which is the Taksin Bridge and Saphan Taksin BTS Station.

=== Transport ===
Bang Rak is served by the BTS Skytrain's Saphan Taksin Station, which connects to the main Sathorn Pier of the Chao Phraya Express Boat. The express boat also serves the respective neighbourhoods of the Oriental, Wat Muang Khae and Si Phraya piers.

== Gallery ==
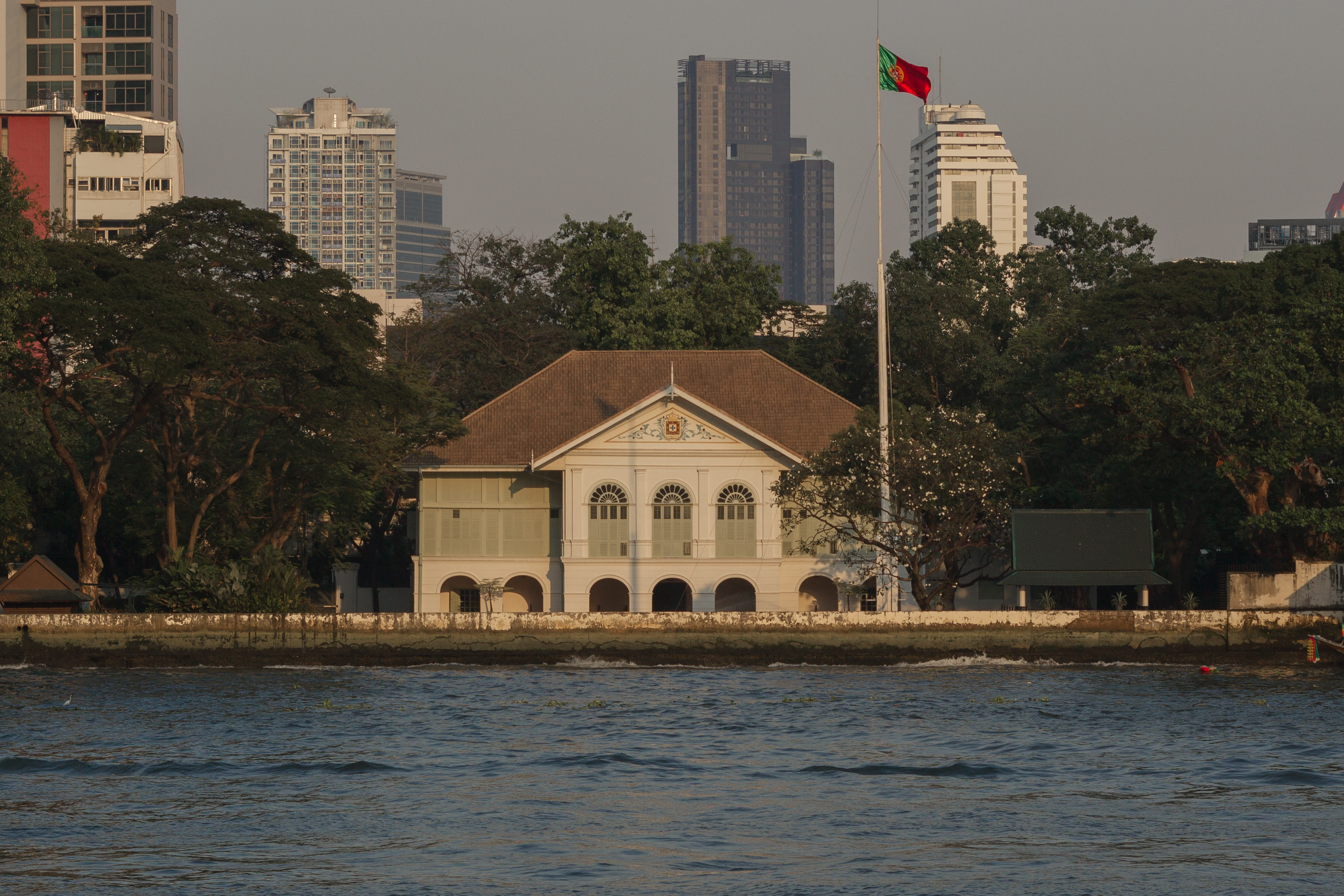
Portuguese Embassy

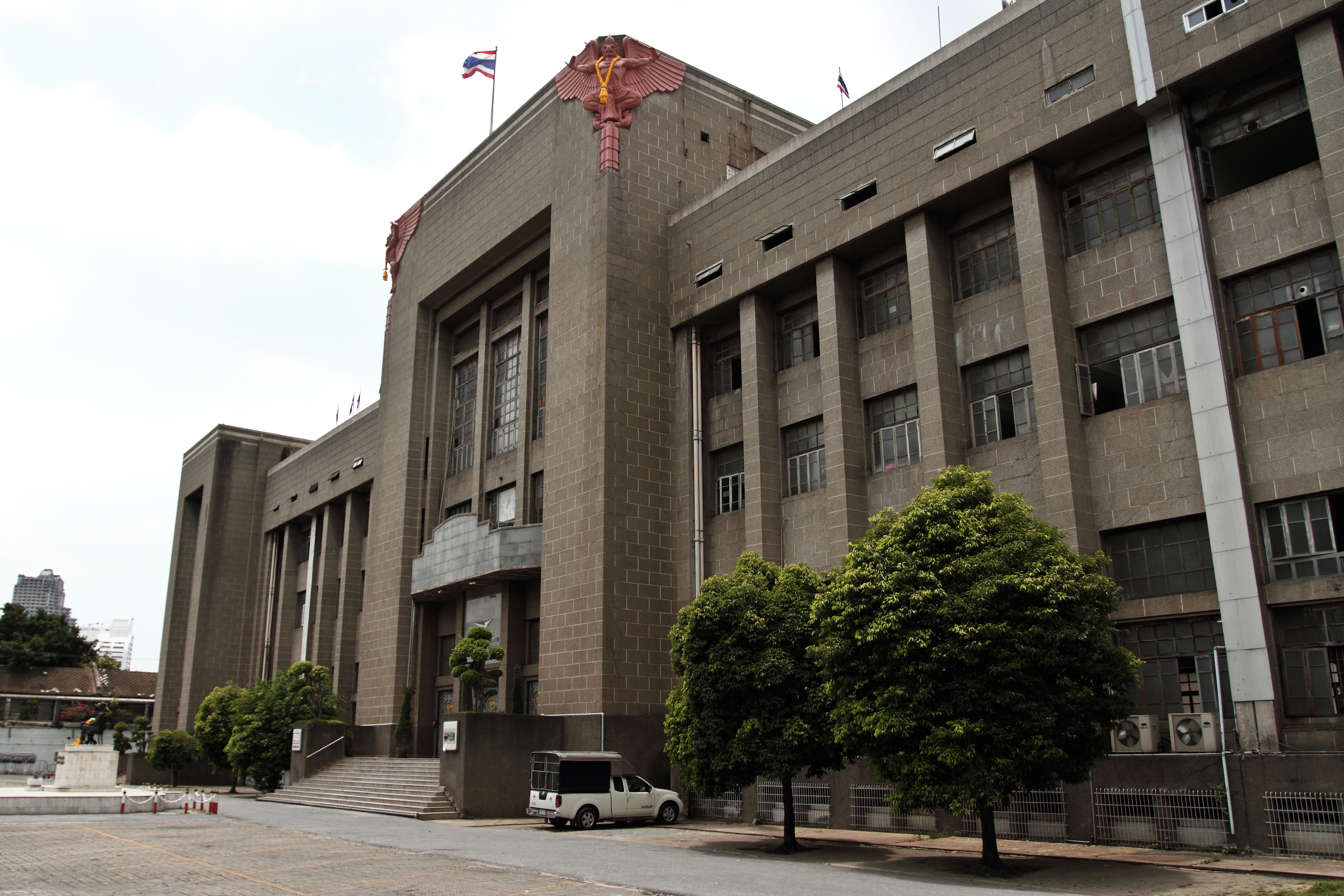
General Post Office

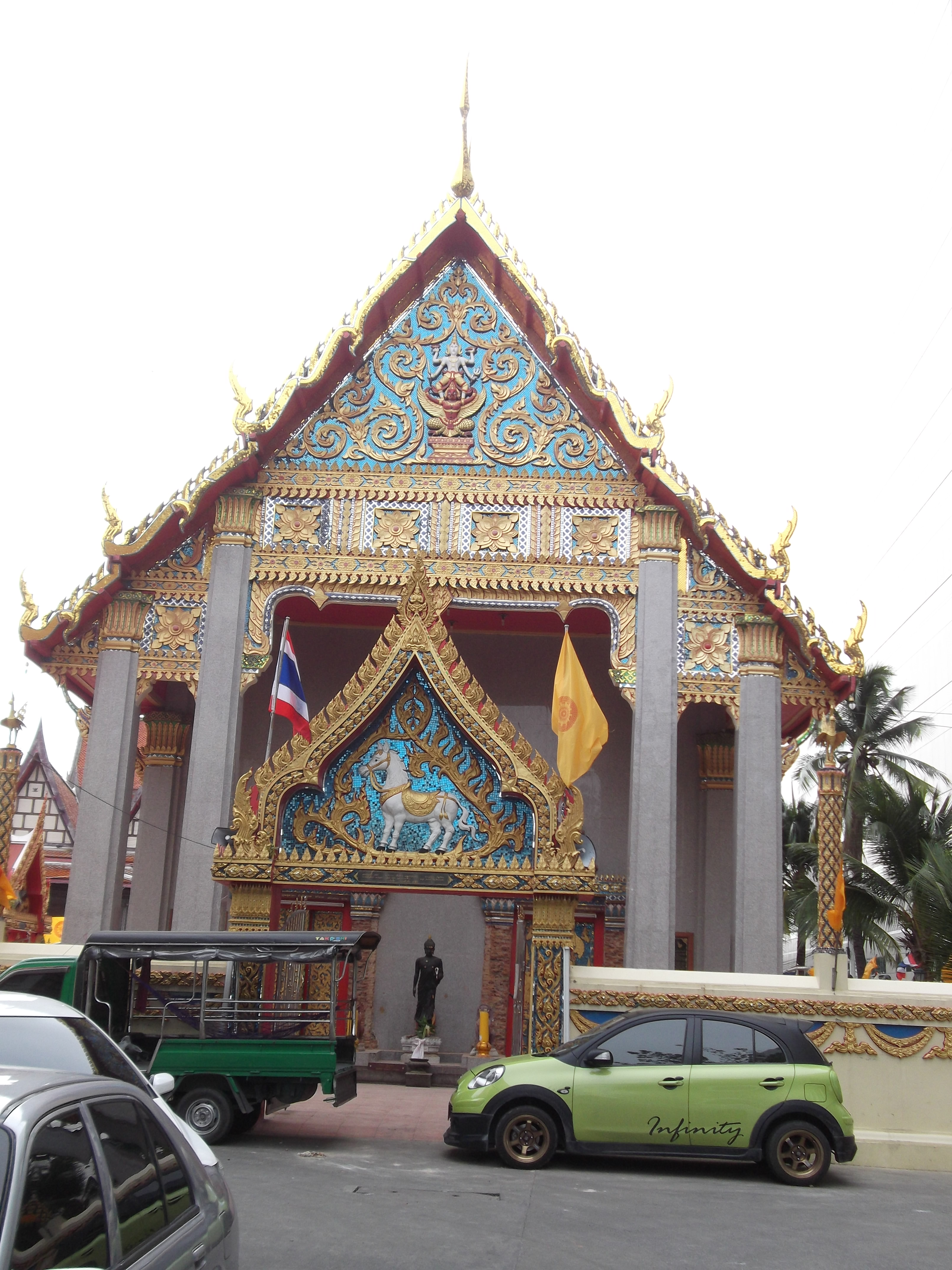
Wat Muang Khae

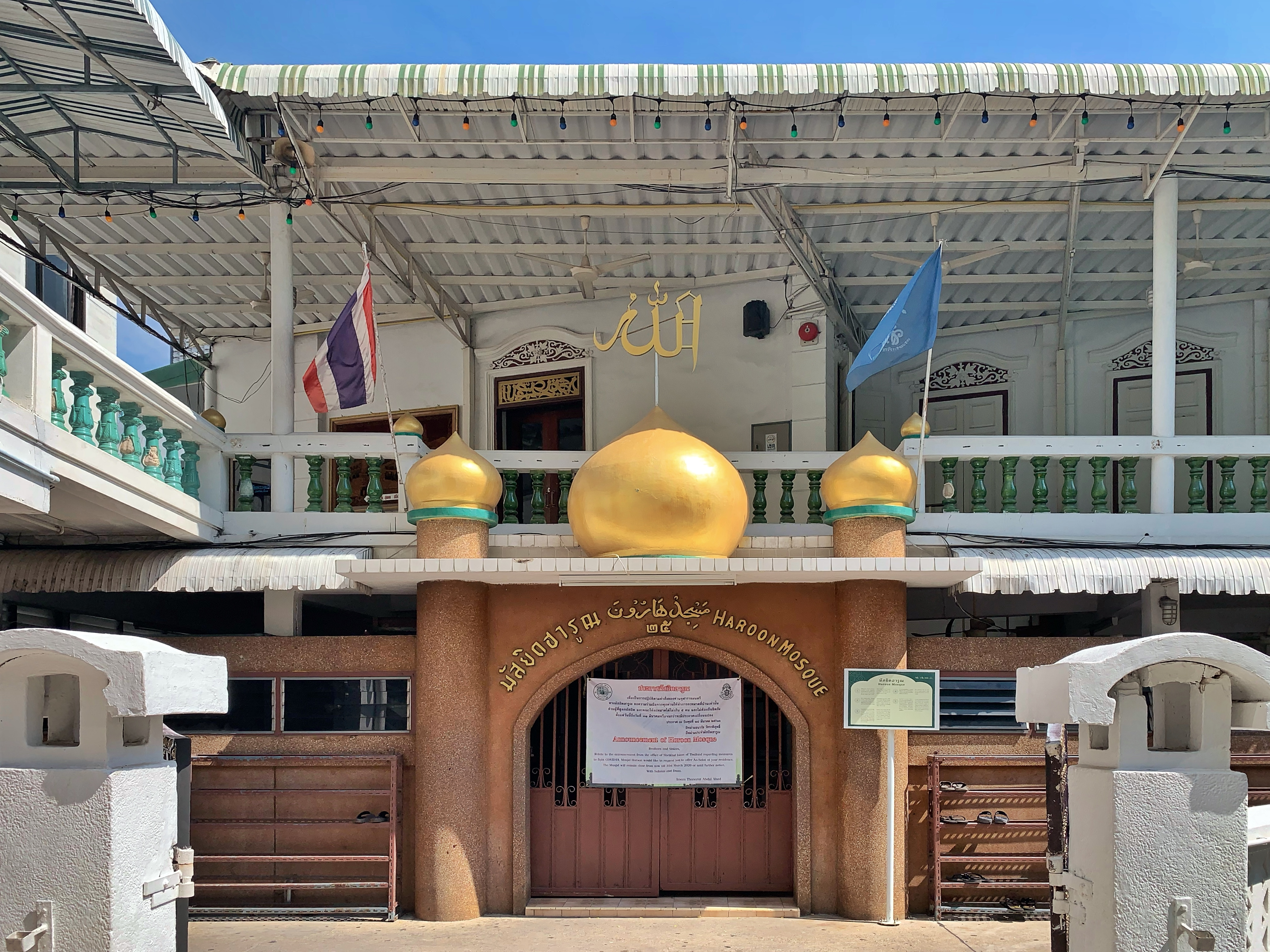
Haroon Mosque

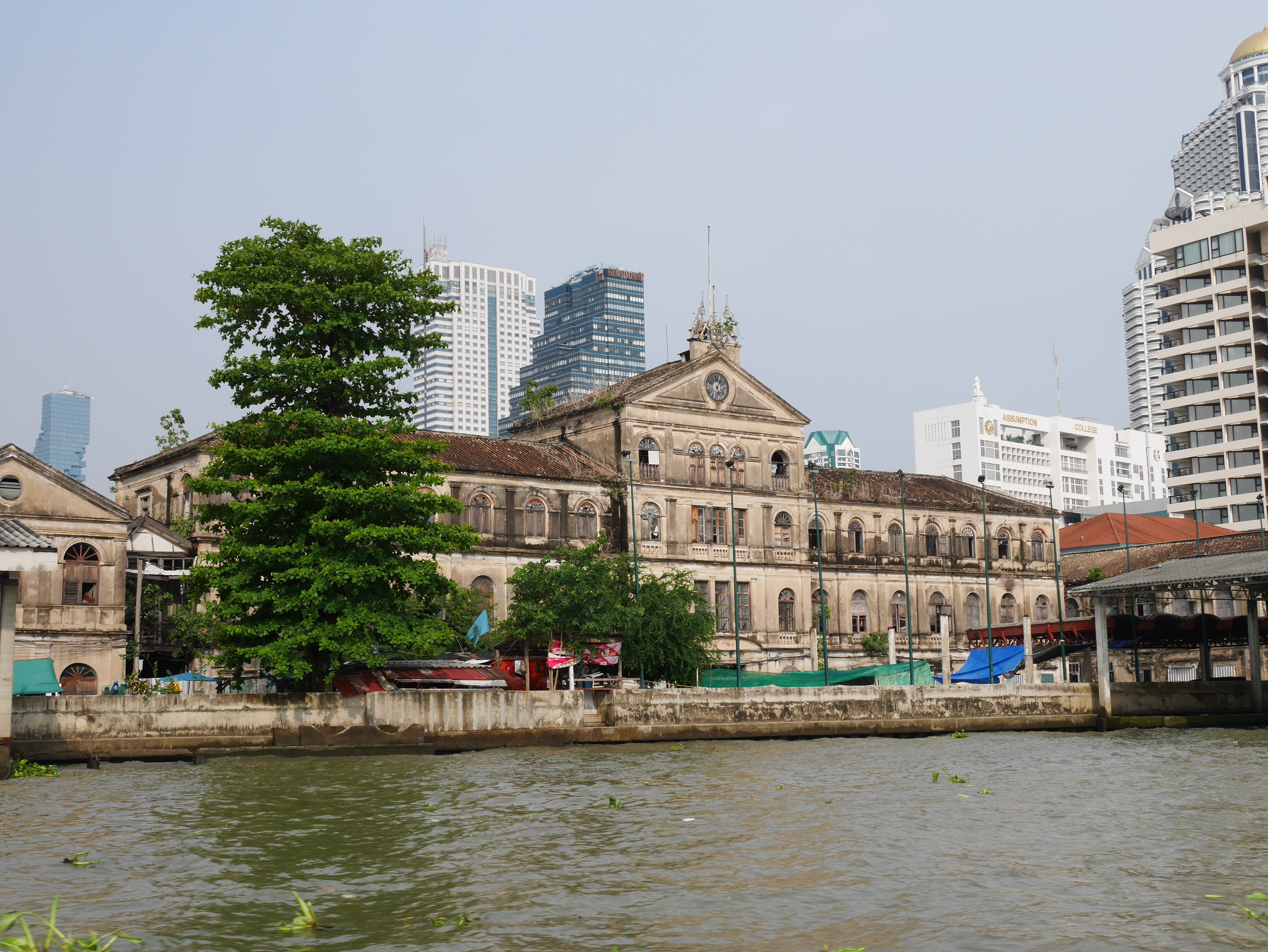
Customs House

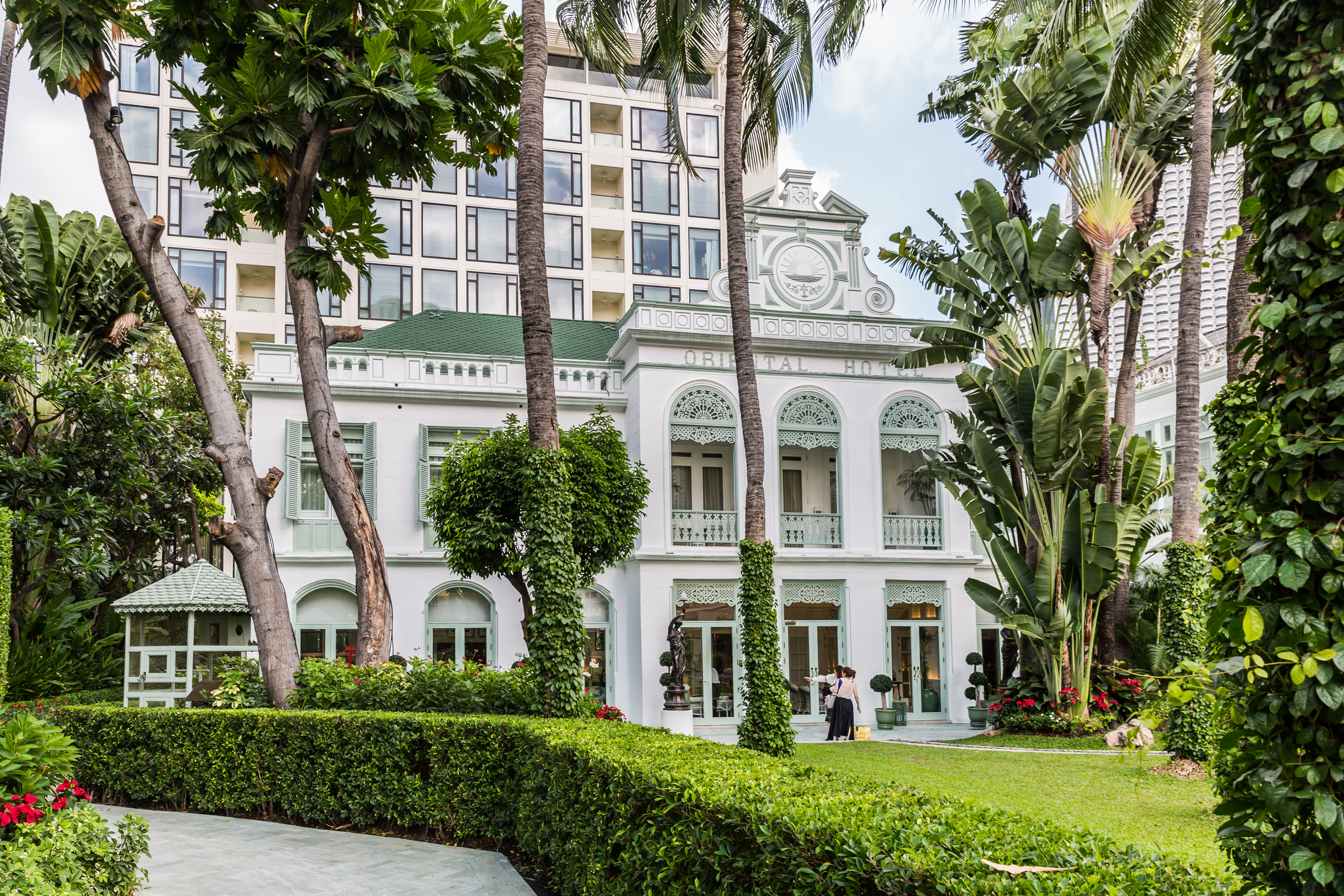
Author's Wing, the Mandarin Oriental, Bangkok

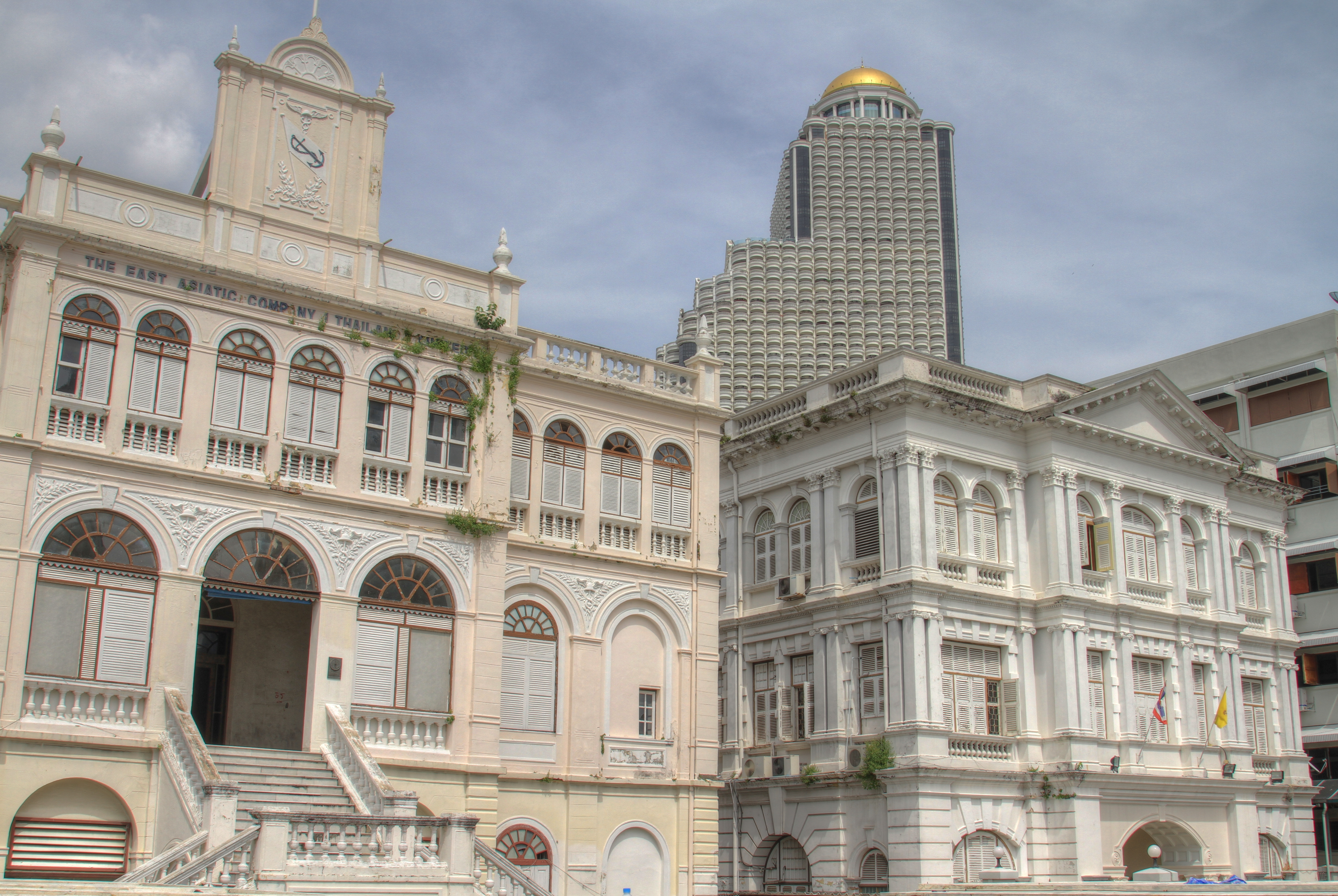
East Asiatic Building and Banque de l'Indochine

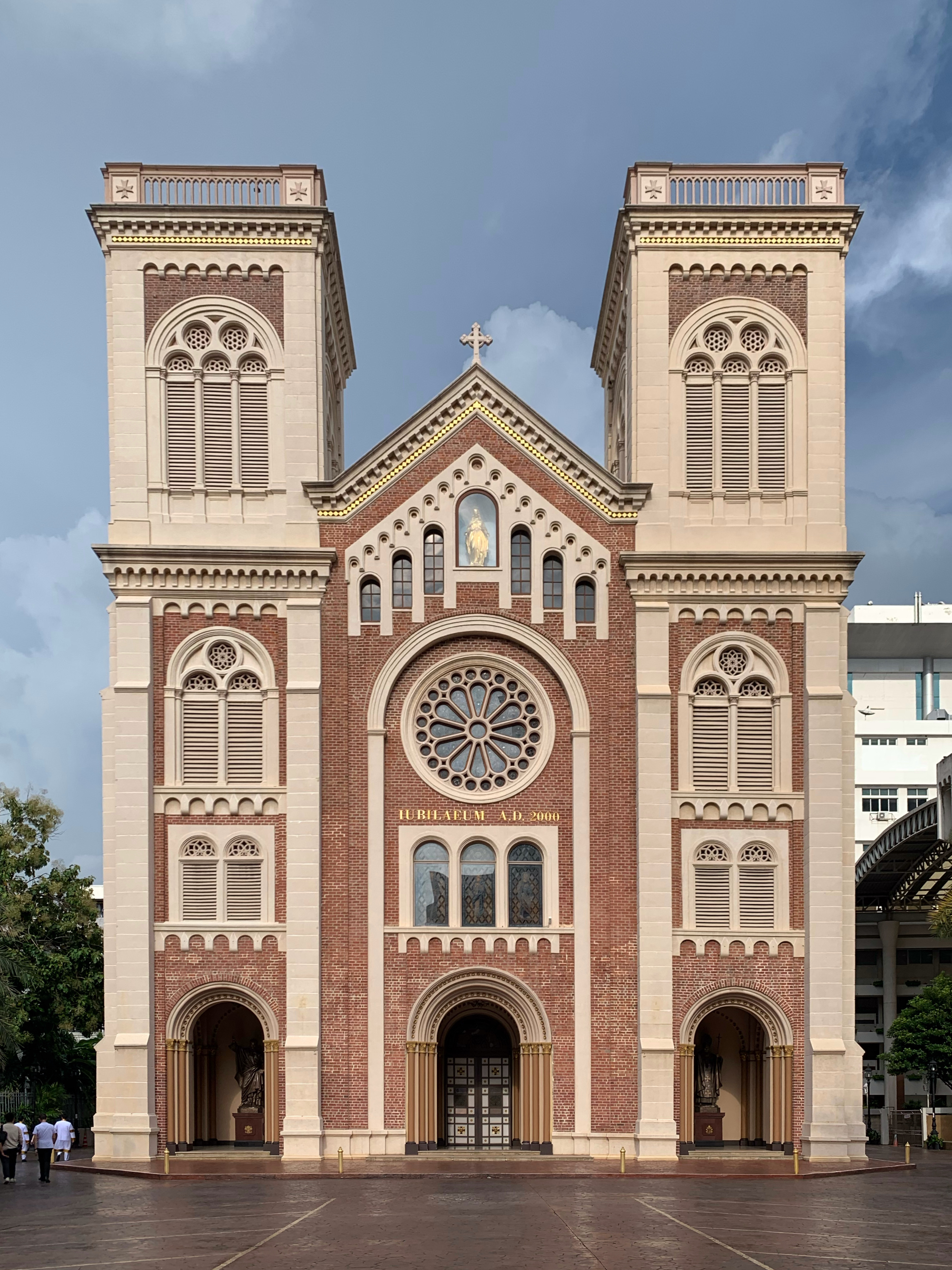
Assumption Cathedral

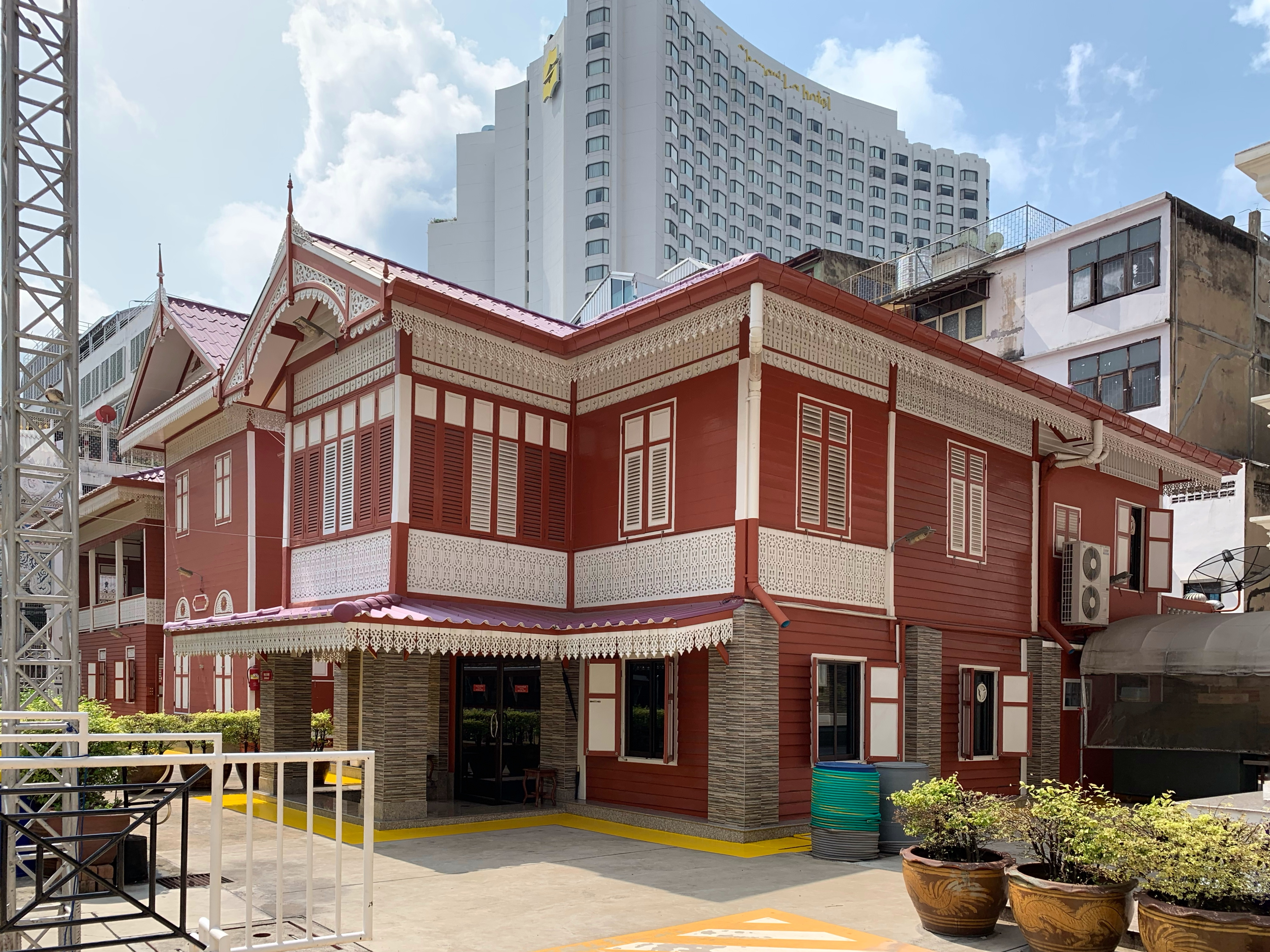
Gingerbread residences, Wat Suan Phlu

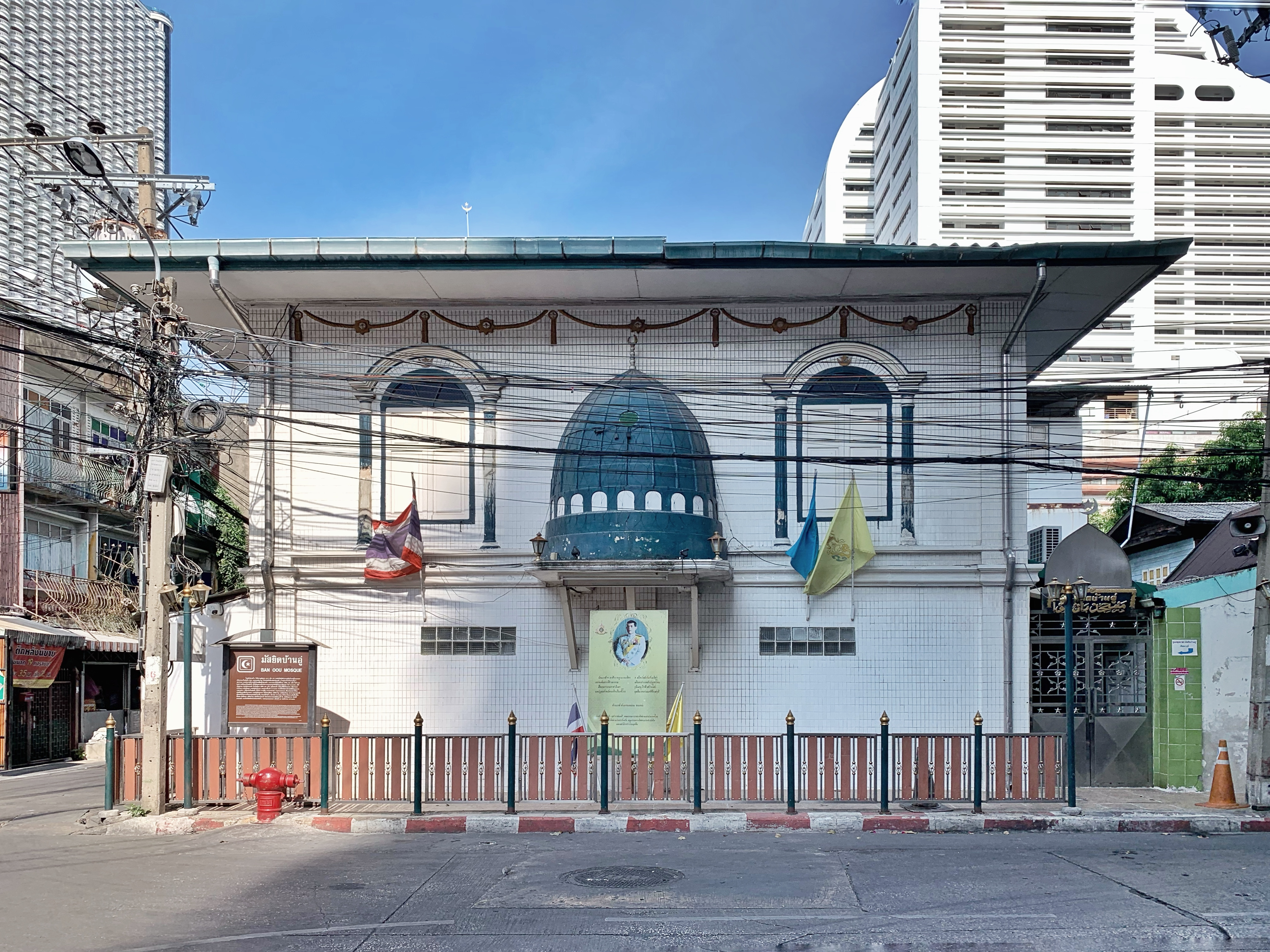
Ban Oou Mosque
