= Franco-Thai Chamber of Commerce =

Franco-Thai Chamber of Commerce (FTCC)
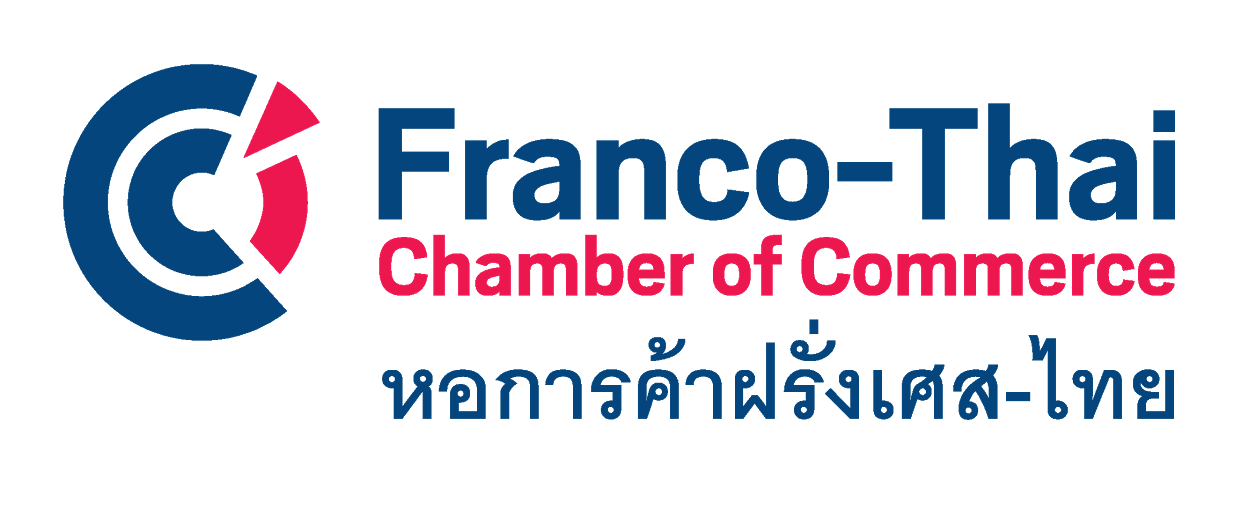
- Company type: Non-profit organization
- Founded: 1966
- Headquarters: 6th Floor, Alliance Francaise Building , 179 Wireless Road, Lumpini, Pathumwan, Bangkok 10330, Thailand
- Website: www.francothaicc.com

Founded in 1966 by French entrepreneurs, the Franco-Thai Chamber of Commerce (FTCC) is today one of the European chambers in Thailand with over 315 members, with business interests in France and Thailand, and more than 60 events organized every year.

The FTCC is a non-profit organization affiliated to CCI France International, a strong network of 113 French bilateral Chambers in 83 Countries with 900 permanent staff and 27,000 members.

The Chamber is also working in collaboration with other trade-related French institutions such as the French Embassy, Economic and Commercial Department, or the Foreign Trade Advisors (“CCE”).

The FTCC mission is fourfold:

- Serve its member's needs.
- Promote bilateral trade between France and Thailand
- Help French companies & entrepreneurs expand in Thailand.
- Assist companies in their recruitment of French nationals.

== Business Club ==
=== Events ===
With more than 50 events organized per year, the FTCC creates opportunities for companies to extend their professional network and to keep updated on the latest developments regarding the economy, legal issues, HR topics, etc.

FTCC events are as varied as possible in order to address the needs of its different categories of Members. They range from monthly networking cocktails, Young Professional social evenings, seminars, committee workshops, special events (its prestigious Gala Dinner, "Bonjour French Fair", "Bonjour Talents": Brand&Career Fair, etc.) to Business matchings ("Forum Travailler Ensemble") and Business delegations to neighboring countries.

=== Advocacy ===
The FTCC is active in defending the interests of its members through its working Committees (Franco-Thai Relations, Human Resources, Legal Affairs, Luxury and Lifestyle, etc.). These allow Members from one sector to discuss issues of common interest. Position papers might be raised by the FTCC via a specific decision procedure or channeled to the European or International Investors' level in Thailand respectively through the EABC (European Association for Business and Commerce), the JFCCT (Joint Foreign Chambers of Commerce in Thailand) or the BOT (Board of Trade) of which the FTCC is an active member. These institutions are well connected to the Thai authority's policy makers and key stakeholders.

For instance, the JFCCT represents 28 Thai-Foreign Chambers gathering 8,000 companies and the EABC represents 16 European trade organizations and currently features 9 working groups. To double this action, the FTCC's Franco-Thai relations committees regularly organizes high level meetings with Thai and French Officials (Board of Investment, Ministers, etc.) to voice the position of its Members.

== Business Support ==
=== Business Support to French companies (FR) ===
FTCC's Business Support department, in coordination with its wide network of partners in Thailand and in France, provides assistance to French companies in every step of their commercial development in Thailand:

- Market information and practical business advice (e.g. setting up a company in Thailand)
- Advice on imports & exports: updated lists of French and Thai importers and exporters, Customs regulations, etc.
- Potential partners targeting (sales or sourcing) for prospecting French companies
- Trade missions (individual or collective) / business appointments arrangement
- Product/offer testing, commercial representation, participation to local trade fairs, adaptation of communication material to local context
- Domiciliation services (P.O. box and mail service, office space, ...)
- Business Center (workstation, conference room, language interpretation/ translation ...)

=== HR Support ===
The FTCC in conjunction with the French Ministry of Foreign Affairs, offers a HR Support service. The FTCC assists French nationals in their job search through specific workshops, promotes French trainees for internships in Thailand, provides information on the local labor market and promotes job vacancies on the FTCC website. FTCC also provides HR related information, organizes workshops, and animates a dynamic HR Club for professionals wishing to debate on HR issues.

=== Business Support to Thai companies (TH) ===
The FTCC Business Support (TH) department aims at helping Thai companies to develop business with France, in collaboration with French partners. This includes providing information (standards, regulations, distribution channels) to Thai companies aiming at developing exports or setting up company in France. The FTCC also provides assistance in organizing individual or collective trade mission, arranging programs of meetings in France, and organizing business study tours.

=== EU-funded Project ===
After the success of SCRIPT, the EU-funded project to certify Thai organic silk and Thai natural spa products and services, the FTCC has engaged in the new project called "Policy Dialogues Support Facility (PDSF)" to further advance Thailand's cooperation with the EU towards achievement of sustainable economic and social development goals and global integration.

The PDSF, started on 15 August 2013, will end on 15 February 2017. It is implemented by a consortium composed of GOPA Consultants, Development Solutions, Sustainable Development Association and the Franco-Thai Chamber of Commerce. The program of €3.75 million (THB 150 million) will provide support for activities of mutual benefit to Thailand and the European Union in areas such as trade and investment, higher education, science and technology, environment, climate change, and good governance.

=== Promosalons ===
The FTCC promotes more than 10 fairs every year, in France and Asia, covering sectors ranging from food, fashion, home decoration, to heavy industries like composite material and environment. Promosalons – an agency promoting French trade fairs across the world – has provided its services to an ever-growing number of 2,000 Thai visitors and exhibitors per year.
