= East Asiatic Building =

Historic building in Bangkok

- อาคารอีสต์เอเชียติก
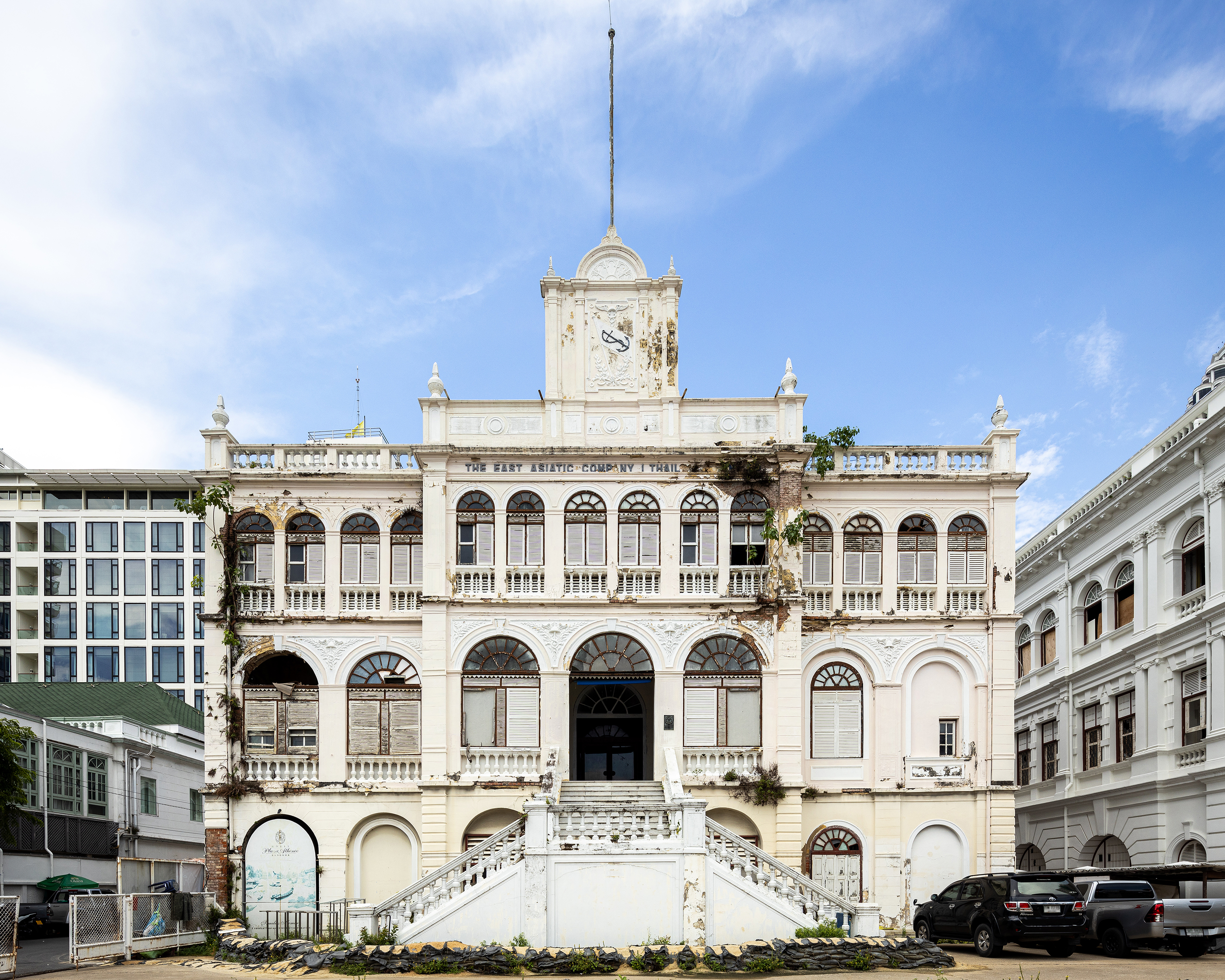
- The building in 2023
- Interactive map of the East Asiatic Building area

General information
- Status: Under renovation
- Architectural style: Renaissance Revival
- Location: Bang Rak District, Bangkok, Thailand
- Coordinates: 13°43′24″N 100°30′51″E
- Owner: Sirivadhanabhakdi family

Technical details
- Floor count: 3

Design and construction
- Architect: Annibale Rigotti
- Awards and prizes: 1984 ASA Architectural Conservation Award

The East Asiatic Building is a historic building in Bangkok's Bang Rak District. It sits on the eastern bank of the Chao Phraya River, opposite the Oriental Hotel on Soi Charoen Krung 40 and adjacent to the Catholic Mission and Assumption Cathedral. The building was built c. 1900 in Renaissance Revival style to designs by Annibale Rigotti, and served as the headquarters of the East Asiatic Company (Thailand) until 1995, receiving the ASA Architectural Conservation Award in 1984. In 2023, Asset World Corporation announced plans to renovate the building into a hotel under the Plaza Athénée brand, in partnership with Nobu Hospitality.

== Site ==
The East Asiatic Building is located at the end of Soi Charoen Krung 40, facing the Chao Phraya River, in Bang Rak district in Bangkok. The building sits next to the Mandarin Oriental Hotel, on opposite sides of the soi. The Mandarin Oriental, originally the Oriental, was formerly owned by Andersen & Co., established by Hans Niels Andersen and Andreas du Plessis de Richelieu, which later become the East Asiatic Company (EAC). The building has direct access to the river via the Oriental pier.

== Architecture ==
Sources credit the building's design to Italian architect Annibale Rigotti. The building, in Renaissance Revival style, is a masonry structure with three floors. The river-facing front façade features rows of semicircular-arched windows and a central projecting porch, the height of the building, topped by a large parapet bearing the company's insignia. A grand front staircase leads up to the main entrance on the middle floor.

== History ==
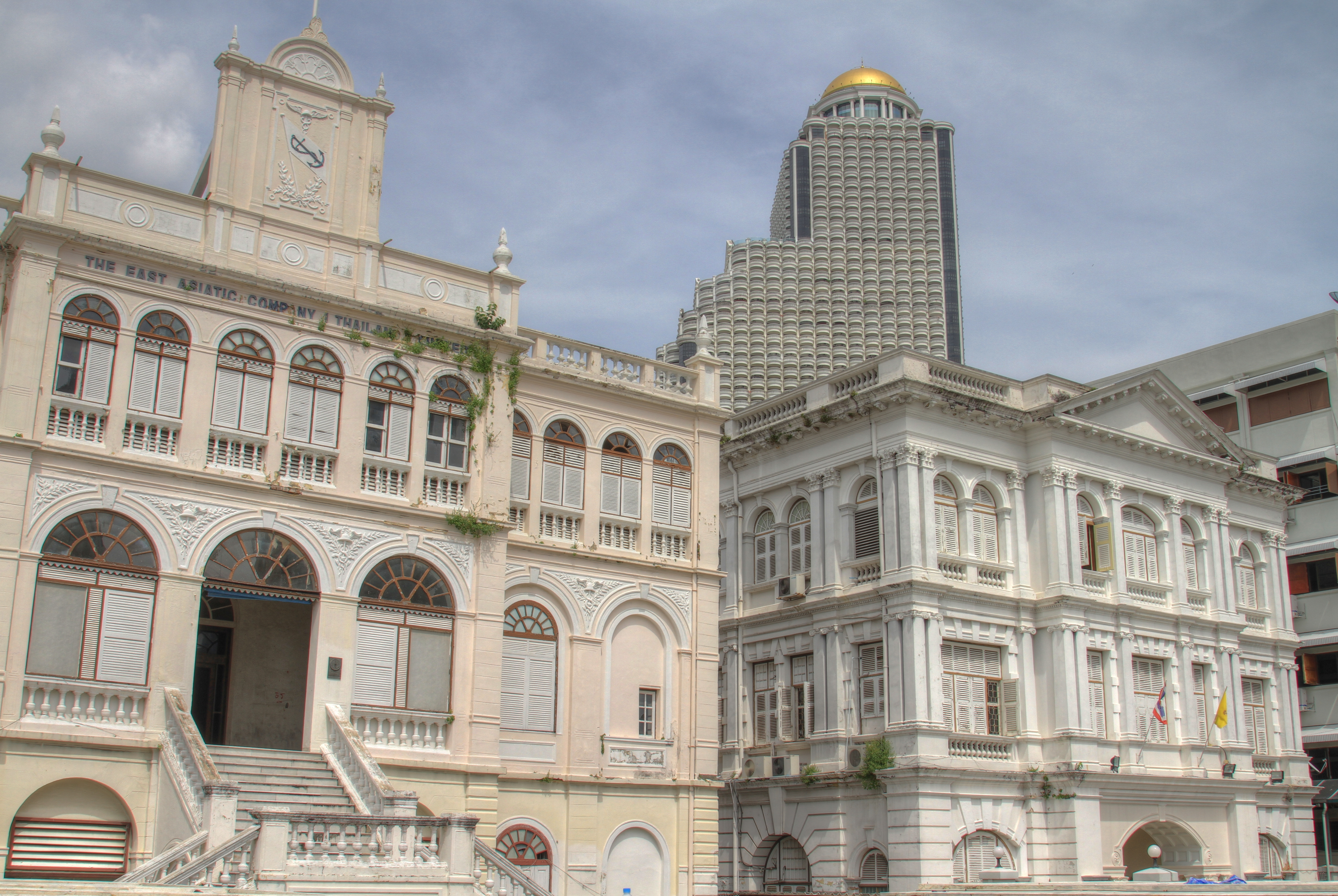
The East Asiatic Building (left), next to the Bank of Indochina, with State Tower in the background

The plot of land where the building stands previously served as a warehouse for the EAC before being torn down for the new building, which was constructed around 1900 to serve as the headquarters of the company. (Note: Sources differ on the date of its construction. Some erroneously list the date as 1884, which is the EAC's foundation date. Others give 1891, 1901, or "around 1900", though all of these predate Rigotti's arrival in Siam in 1907.) In 1995, EAC Thailand moved its headquarters to Lumpini Tower, and the building was sold to Charoen Sirivadhanabhakdi's business group. For some time in the 2010s, it was used as a commercial event space and rented as a filming location, administrated by Charoenkrung Studio. The building is generally closed to the public, but was opened to visitors in November 2018 when it was one of the venues for the Bangkok Art Biennale.

=== Future ===
In 2023, Asset World Corporation (AWC), a real estate developer under the Sirivadhanabhakdi family's business group, announced that it would renovate the building as a hotel, to be operated under partnership with Nobu Hospitality as the Plaza Athénée Nobu Hotel and Spa Bangkok. Due to the building's cultural significance and heritage, AWC will preserve the building's exterior, whilst incorporating elements of Nobu hotels. The hotel is planned to be completed by 2026.

== See also ==
- Asiatique, a night market renovated situated in the former docks of the EAC
- Banque de l'Indochine, whose 1908 branch building is adjacent
