= Mandarin Oriental, Bangkok =

Hotel in Bangkok, Thailand

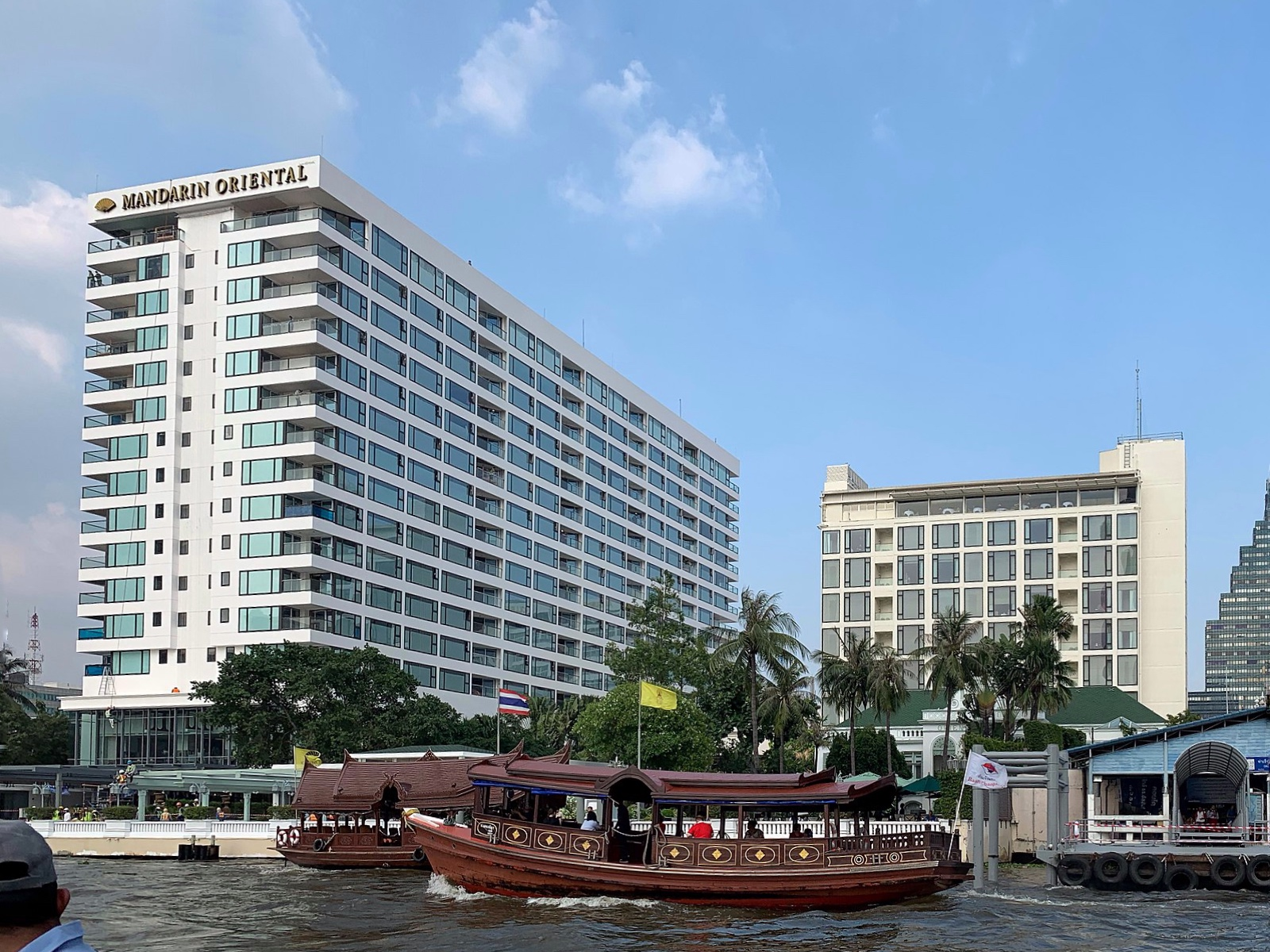
- View of Mandarin Oriental, Bangkok from the Chao Phraya River

- Location within Bangkok

General information
- Location: 48 Oriental Avenue, Bangkok 10500, Thailand
- Coordinates: 13°43′25″N 100°30′52″E
- Opening: 1876; 150 years ago
- Operator: Mandarin Oriental Hotel Group

Other information
- Number of rooms: 393
- Number of suites: 35
- Number of restaurants: 8

Website
- MandarinOriental.com/bangkok

Mandarin Oriental, Bangkok is a hotel near the Chao Phraya River, Bangkok, managed by Mandarin Oriental Hotel Group. The building first opened as The Oriental in 1876, as one of the first hotel built in Thailand.

== History ==
When Siam opened to foreign trade after the signing of the Bowring Treaty, the sailors that crewed the ships though Bangkok required accommodation on shore. To meet this demand, Captain Dyers, an American, and his partner J.E. Barnes, opened a hotel called the Oriental Hotel. This burnt down in 1865.

Several years later, a partnership of Danish captains opened a replacement hotel. In the 1870s, the board of the Oriental Hotel decided the opening of the new River Wing in 1876 as the official establishment date of the Oriental Hotel.

=== H. N. Andersen ===
In 1881, 29-year-old Hans Niels Andersen, a Danish businessman, bought the premises. His various business ventures led to him becoming a much-respected member of the Western community in Siam. Andersen identified a need for a respectable hotel with good accommodation, a bar, and a western menu to meet the needs of travelers and businessmen visiting Siam.

Encouraged by Prince Prisdang Jumsai, Hans Niels Andersen formed a partnership with Peter Andersen and Frederick Kinch to build a luxury hotel. Designed by Cardu & Rossi, a team of local Italian architects, the Oriental was the first luxury hotel in Siam. The hotel opened on 19 May 1887 with 40 rooms and features which at the time had never been seen in Siam outside a royal palace: a second floor (during a time of single-storey bungalows), carpeted hallways, smoking and ladies' rooms, a billiards room and a bar capable of seating 50 patrons. To ensure the success of the restaurant and a satisfactory level of service, the owners lured the chef and butler from the French Consulate away to work at the hotel.

The first major event that the hotel hosted was a grand banquet on 24 May 1888 to celebrate the Golden Jubilee of Queen Victoria. After personally inspecting the hotel’s facilities in December 1890, King Chulalongkorn decided the hotel was up to the standard necessary to host visiting royalty. The hotel's first royal guests were the entourage of Crown Prince Nicholas of Russia (later Tsar Nicholas II) in April 1891.

Marie Maire took over ownership of the hotel in 1910 and immediately set to work renovating it. She sold the property in 1932, but during World War Two, it was leased by the Japanese Army and used as an officer's club (under management by the Imperial Hotel of Tokyo). Once World War Two ended, Allied prisoners who thought the hotel still belonged to Japan occupied and vandalized it.

=== Germaine Krull ===
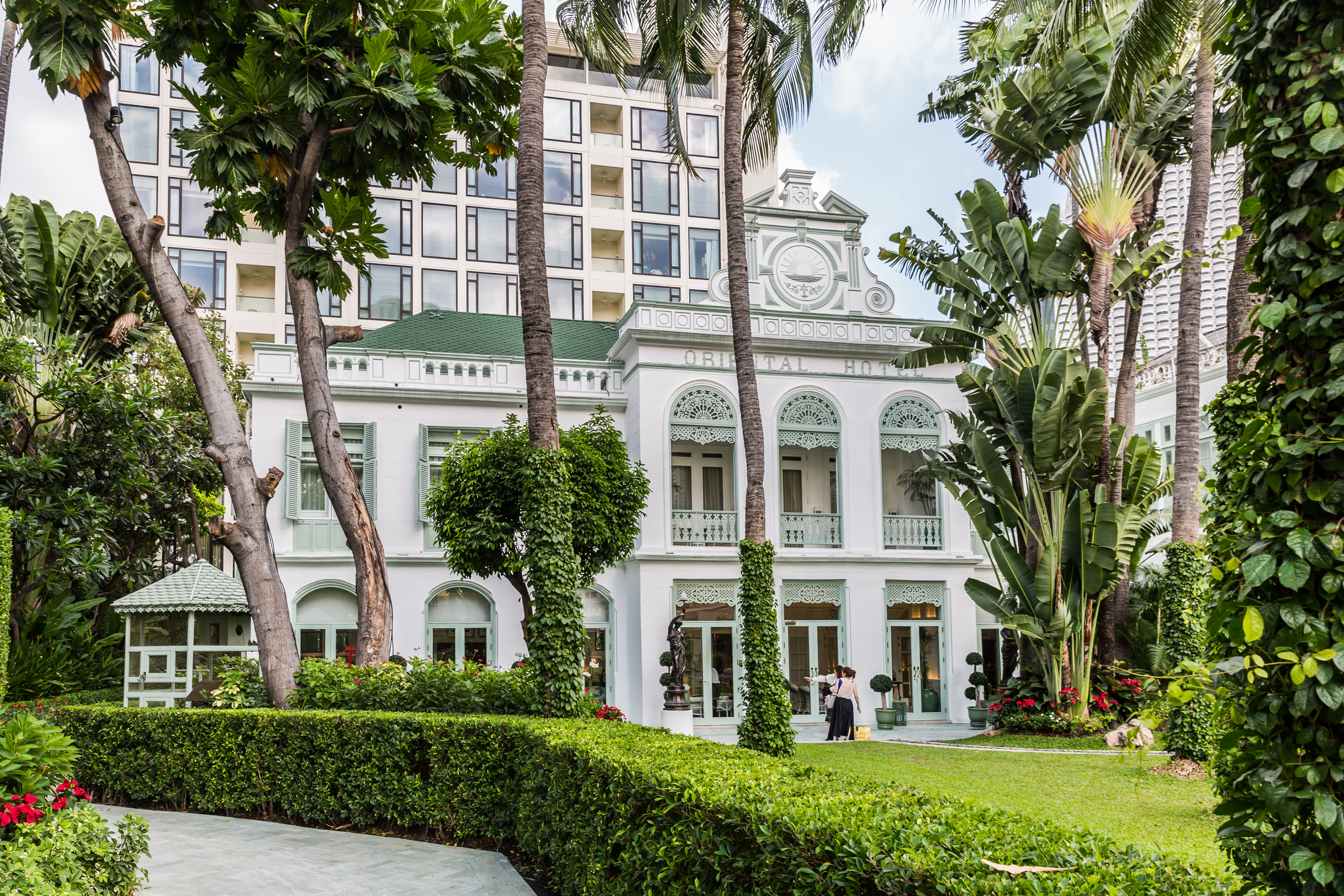
The original 19th-century Authors' Wing

At the end of the war, a six-person partnership each contributed US$250 to buy the hotel, badly run down from its wartime service. The partnership consisted of Germaine Krull (1897–1985), Prince Bhanu, General Chai Prateepasen, Pote Sarasin (prominent businessman and lawyer) and John Webster and Jim Thompson, two Americans who had served in the Office of Strategic Services (OSS) and who had stayed on in Thailand. Krull took the position of manager in 1947, despite no prior experience in the hotel field. Born in Germany, she had been best known as a photographer during the 1920s before service in the Pacific as a war correspondent for Agence France Presse. The hotel's restoration and restocking offered Thompson an opportunity to put to use his architectural and artistic abilities.

The hotel reopened for business on 12 June 1947. Krull turned out to be a natural hotelier and during her reign restored the hotel to its position as the premier hotel in Thailand. Thompson soon left the partnership over a plan to build a new wing, though he stayed on in residence at the hotel for some time. To compete with popular clubs and a new local bar called Chez Eve, Krull established the Bamboo Bar, which soon became one of the leading bars in Bangkok.

In 1958 the ten-story Garden Wing was built. It featured the city’s first elevator and was home to the Le Normandie Restaurant. In 1967, fearful that Thailand would fall to the communists, Krull sold her share to Italthai which at the time was well on its way to becoming one of the country’s most significant mercantile groups eventually totaling some 60 companies involved in almost all aspects of the Thai economy.

=== Italthai ===
Italthai had been founded in the mid-fifties by Giorgio Berlingieri, an Italian born in Genoa, and Dr Chaijudh Karnasuta, a Thai. Berlingieri felt that the Oriental had begun to rest on its laurels and had dropped behind its competitors. He wanted to develop the Oriental into one of the best hotels in the world. Too involved with his various businesses to devote time to the project, Berlingieri in November 1967 appointed 30-year-old Kurt Wachtveitl (1937– ), at that time manager of Nipa Lodge (a hotel that Italthai owned in Pattaya), as general manager of the Oriental.

In 1972 the hotel acquired an adjacent property upon which it erected the 350-room River Wing.

=== Mandarin Oriental Hotel Group and Mandarin Oriental, Bangkok ===
The Group began with the opening of its flagship property, The Mandarin, in Hong Kong in 1963, which soon built up a reputation for luxurious service. In 1974, Mandarin International Hotels Limited was formed as a hotel management company. The Group's intention was to expand into Asia and operate hotels with a standard of service comparable to their property in Hong Kong.

In 1974 the company's hotel interests expanded further through the acquisition of a 49% interest in The Oriental, Bangkok. Through the management of both The Mandarin in Hong Kong and The Oriental, in Bangkok, the Group was in an unusual position of having two "flagship" hotels. In 1985, the Company rationalized its corporate structure by combining these two properties under a common name, Mandarin Oriental Hotel Group.

The hotel opened its renowned Oriental Spa in 1993 and finished a complete renovation of its rooms and suites in 2003. In 2006, The Oriental, Bangkok celebrated its 130th anniversary. In September 2008, the hotel formally changed its name from The Oriental, Bangkok to Mandarin Oriental, Bangkok.

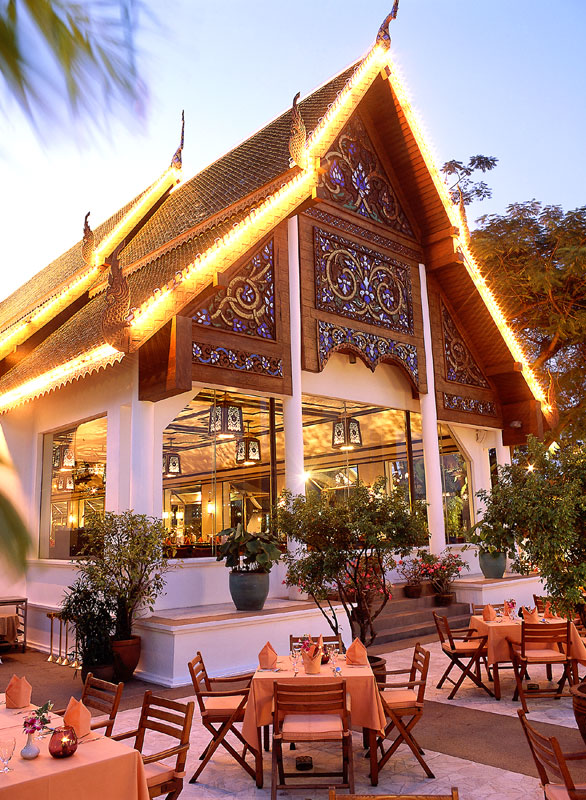
Sala Rim Naam restaurant and terrace

== Awards ==
- Ranked best hotel in the world by the Telegraph Hotel rankings. (November 2024)
- Rated second hotel in the world by Hotels Digest Global Ratings (January 2026)
- Named “Best City Hotel in Asia” and one of the “Top 20 Hotels Worldwide” (Travel + Leisure's annual World Best Awards 2009)
- Best City Center Hotel Spa Worldwide (Luxury Travel Advisor, December 2008 - Awards of Excellence)
- Urban Spa of the Year (AsiaSpa Magazine, November 2008 - AsiaSpa Awards)
- Named one of the 400 Best Hotels (Forbes Traveler, November 2008)
- No. 8 in Overseas Leisure Hotels - Asia & the Indian Subcontinent (Condé Nast Traveller, October 2008 - Readers’ Travel Awards)
- No. 13 in Spas in Overseas Hotel (Condé Nast Traveller, October 2008 - Readers’ Travel Awards)
- No. 3 in Top 20 International City Hotels (Andrew Harper’s Hideaway Report, September 2008 - The World’s Best Hotel, Resorts & Hideaways)
- Named one of top 50 hotels in the world 2023
- Named on Condé Nast Gold list 2023
- 2023 Tripadvisor tTravellers' choice award

== Photo gallery ==
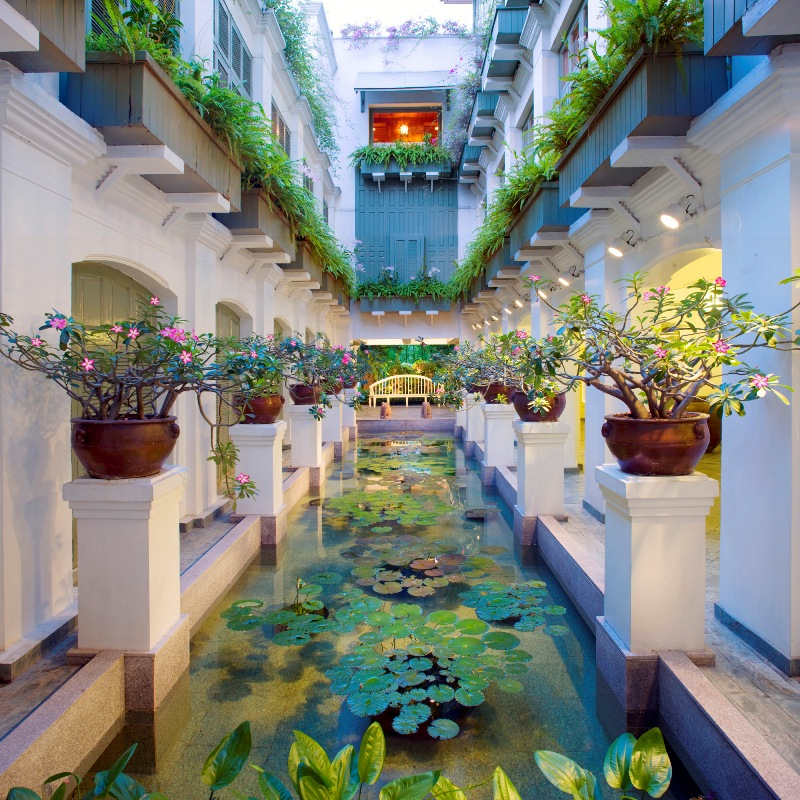
The Oriental Spa

== See also ==
- Mandarin Oriental Hotel Group
- Mandarin Oriental, Hong Kong
- Mandarin Oriental Hyde Park, London
- Mandarin Oriental, New York
- Mandarin Oriental, Miami
- East Asiatic Building
- Jardines
