= Embassy of France, Bangkok =

Diplomatic mission

Coordinates: 13°43′29″N 100°30′52″E

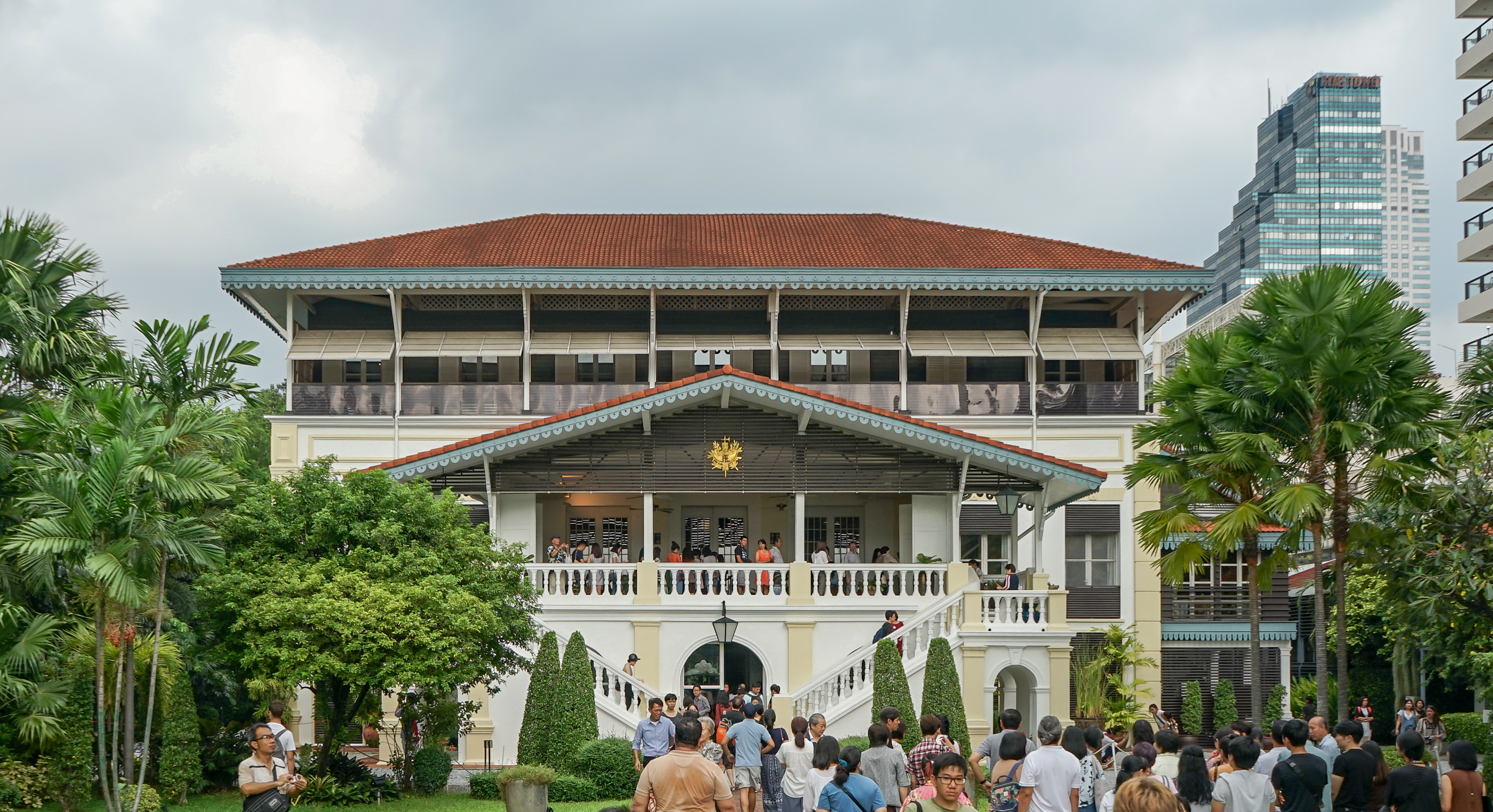
The ambassador's residence. The embassy is opened to the public annually during European Heritage Days.

The Embassy of France in Bangkok is the chief diplomatic mission of France in Thailand, and one of the oldest in the country. It was established as a consulate in its current location on the Chao Phraya River off Charoen Krung Road in Bangkok's Bang Rak District in 1857, following the signing of the Treaty of Friendship and Commerce which re-established diplomatic relations between the two countries the previous year. The mission was elevated to a legation in 1892 and an embassy in 1949, and supports the ambassador in promoting political, economic and cultural ties between the two countries.

The original embassy building, which now serves as the ambassador's residence, predates the embassy's establishment, and was probably built during the 1840s–1850s, undergoing major modifications between 1875 and 1894, as well as several later renovations and restorations. It is recognized as a historic heritage building, having received the ASA Architectural Conservation Award in 1984, and stands in contrast with the striking contemporary design of the embassy's new office building, completed in 2015.

== History ==
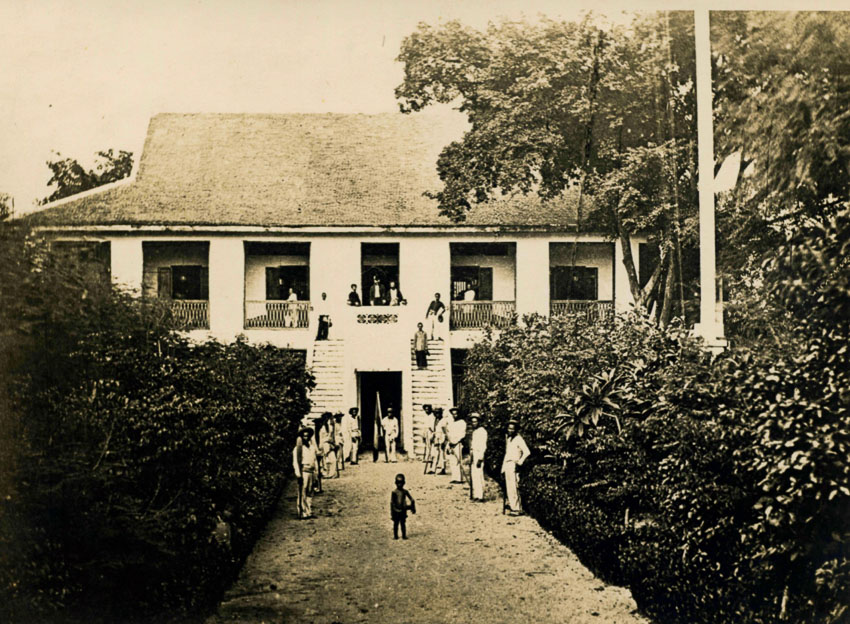
The consulate in the 19th century

Diplomatic relations between France and Siam (as Thailand was historically known) date to the 17th century, when King Narai of Ayutthaya exchanged embassies with Louis XIV, but ended abruptly when the French were expelled in the Siamese revolution of 1688. While French Catholic priests continued to work in Siam, official relations only resumed during the mid-19th century, when King Mongkut (Rama IV, r. 1851–1868) significantly opened up the country to the West. Following the landmark Bowring Treaty with the United Kingdom in 1855, other Western countries entered into similar agreements with Siam, which liberalized trade and granted several concessions to the foreign powers, including the Franco-Siamese Treaty of 1856. The Comte de Castelnau then became the French consul to Siam, and Mongkut granted the French use of a piece of land by the Chao Phraya River, in the area now known as Bang Rak, for establishing a consulate in 1857.

The land came with a building, which was probably previously used as a customs office. It probably dates to the late Rama III to early Rama IV reigns (late 1840s to early 1850s), though details of its original construction and designer are unknown. It was originally a two-storey masonry structure with a Dutch gable roof, demonstrating American colonial and neo-Palladian influence typical of early Western architecture in Siam. Offices were located downstairs, with the consul's residence on the upper floor.

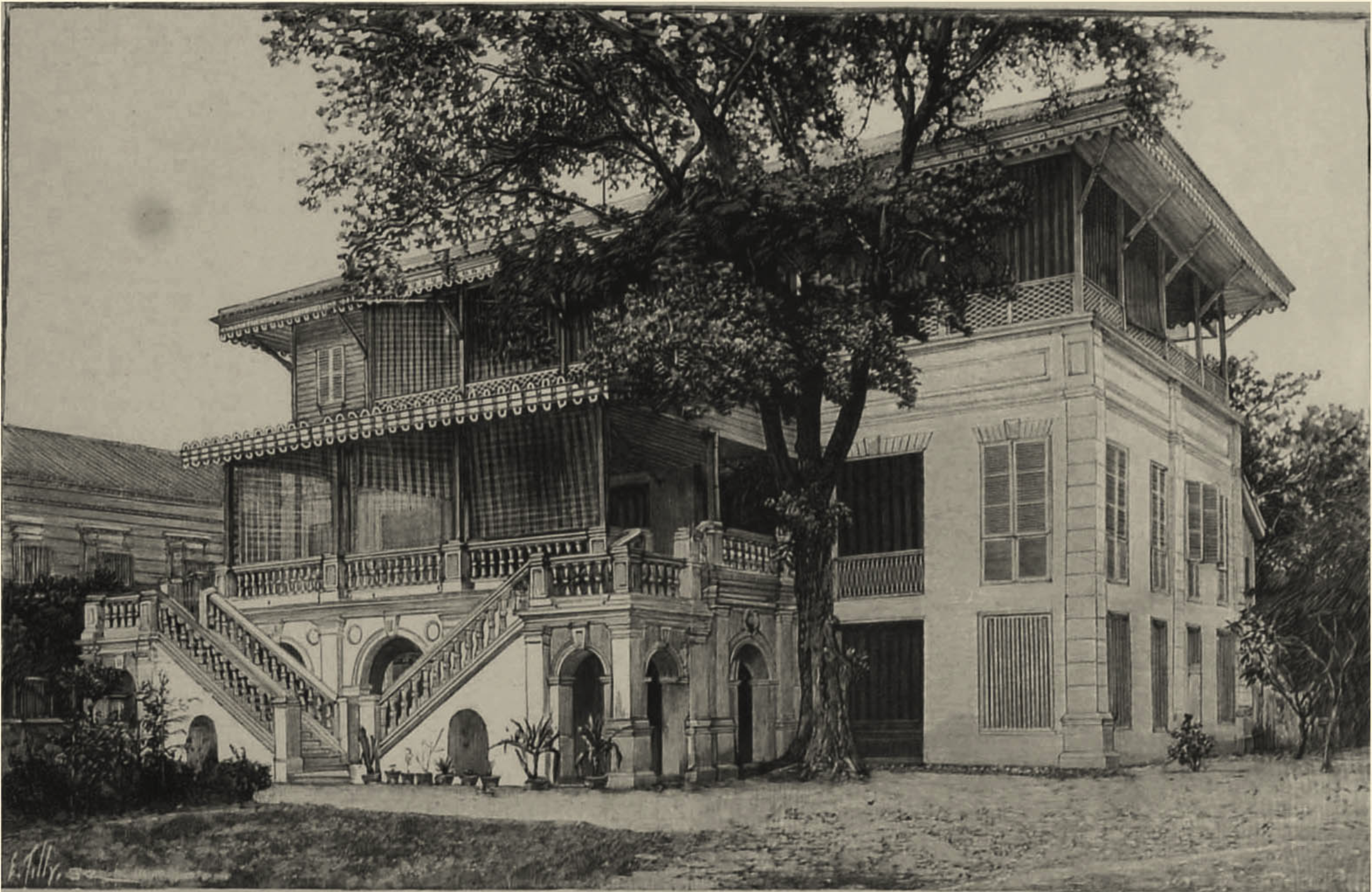
The consulate, depicted in an 1893 issue of L'Illustration covering the Paknam Incident

Rights to the land were granted to the French by King Chulalongkorn in 1875. Between 1875 and 1894, the building underwent several modifications, which added a front porch—with a Roman-arched gallery on the lower floor, a veranda on the upper floor, and an ornate outdoor staircase connecting the two—and a third floor, of wooden construction, surrounded by a latticework frame and decorated in Victorian gingerbread style. Further renovations in 1901 added a rear annex featuring a teak dining hall and other support buildings. By the early 20th century, the Bang Rak area had become a busy commercial hub, thanks to development that flowed along Charoen Krung Road. As the nearby British legation relocated to the quieter Phloen Chit area in 1922, so did the French consider moving, but the plans never materialized. However, the embassy would later establish a second office on Sathon Road, on a plot of land shared with the Alliance Française.

The mission was the centre of French diplomatic activity in Siam, including the confrontations of the 1893 Franco-Siamese crisis, when French naval ships sailed up the Chao Phraya to anchor at the consulate during the Paknam Incident. It was occupied by Japanese forces during World War II, and only resumed operations a few years after the war, which left much damage requiring extensive repairs. The mission had been elevated to a legation in 1892, and was established as an embassy in 1949. Further renovations and restorations were undertaken through the years, especially between 1959 and 1968. The most recent work, in the 2000s, removed later-added wall partitions to improve ventilation and bring the main building, which now serves as the ambassador's residence, closer to its original state. The building received the ASA Architectural Conservation Award in 1984.

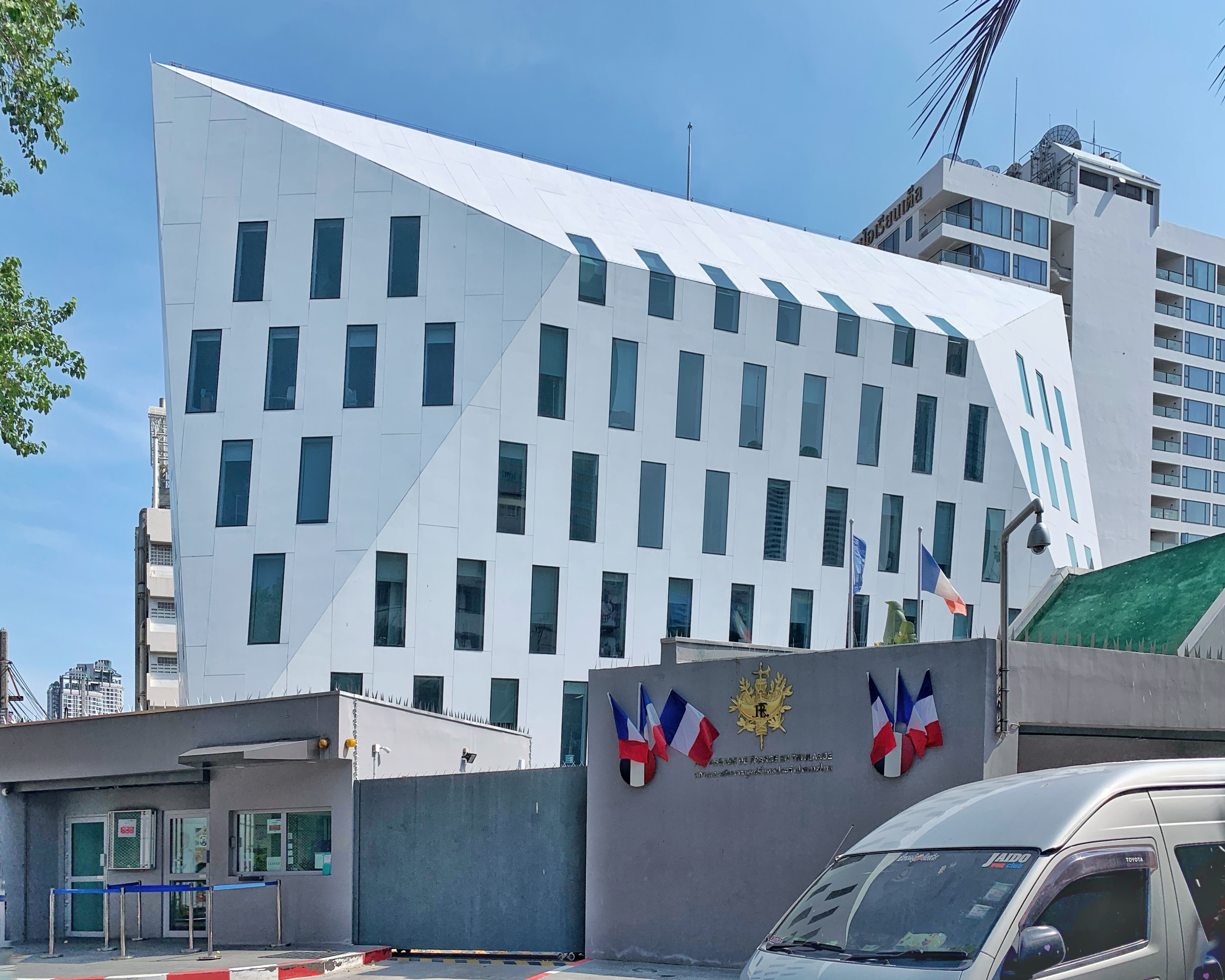
The new embassy offices

In 2011, the embassy and the Alliance Française announced the sale of their Sathon property. A new office building was built in the original Charoen Krung embassy compound from 2012, and opened in 2015, with all embassy services consolidated there. (The Alliance Française moved to a new, separate campus on Witthayu Road.) The building, by the French firm ADP Ingénierie, features a striking contemporary design, with a monolithic, prismatic appearance that stands in sharp contrast with the ambassador's residence.
