= Aimé Dupond =

French Catholic bishop (1809–1872)

The Right Reverend Ferdinand Aimé Augustin Joseph Dupond M.E.P.
- Vicar Apostolic of Eastern Siam
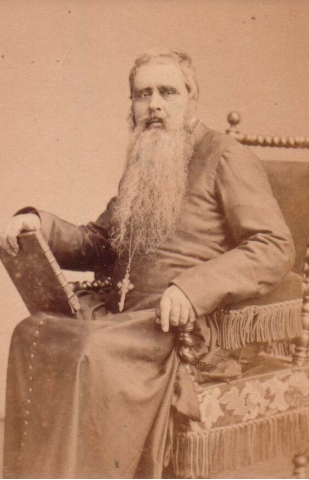
- Installed: 9 September 1864
- Term ended: 11 December 1872
- Predecessor: Jean-Baptiste Pallegoix
- Successor: Jean-Louis Vey

Orders
- Ordination: 21 December 1833 as priest and 9 September 1864 as Vicar Apostolic of Eastern Siam and Titular Bishop of Azotus
- Consecration: 22 February 1865 by Bishop Jean-Claude Miche

Personal details
- Born: 17 November 1809 Flers, France
- Died: 11 December 1872 (aged 63) Bangkok
- Buried: Church of Immaculate Conception of Bangkok
- Denomination: Roman Catholic

Ferdinand Aimé Augustin Joseph Dupond M.E.P. (17 November 1809 – 11 December 1872) was a French Roman Catholic missionary and bishop who served as Vicar Apostolic of Eastern Siam from 1864 to 1872.

== Biography ==
Dupond was born on 17 November 1809 in Flers. He was educated at Amettes College and the seminary of Arras. He was ordained a priest on 21 December 1833 and served as vicar at Beaurains. In 1838, he joined the seminary of the Paris Foreign Missions Society and the following year was sent to Siam.

In 1839, he began his missionary work in the parish of Notre-Dame du Rosaire in Bangkok which was soon extended to the surrounding region. He then worked as a travelling missionary before he was transferred to China where he served from 1849 to 1851. On his return to Bangkok, he resumed his post at the Notre-Dame du Rosaire parish, and worked as a travelling missionary whilst preaching against opium use.

In 1862, on the death of Jean-Baptiste Pallegoix, Vicar Apostolic of Eastern Siam, Superior M. Clemenceau governed the Siam Mission until his death two years later. On 9 September 1864, Dupond succeeded Pallegoix as Apostolic Vicar of Eastern Siam, and at the same time was appointed Titular Bishop of Azotus. He was consecrated as bishop on 22 February 1865 in Saigon by Bishop Jean-Claude Miche.

In his annual report on the Siam Mission in 1867 he estimated the number of Christians at 8,000 with 924 new baptisms. In 1870, he participated in the First Vatican Council in Rome, and took part in meetings for the revision of the regulations of the Paris Foreign Missions Society. He died on 11 December 1872 in Bangkok, and was buried in the Church of Immaculate Conception of Bangkok.

== Honours ==
In 1872, Dupond was named Knight of the Legion of Honour.
