= Lad Krabang 54 Stadium =

Football stadium in Thailand

- Forza Stadium
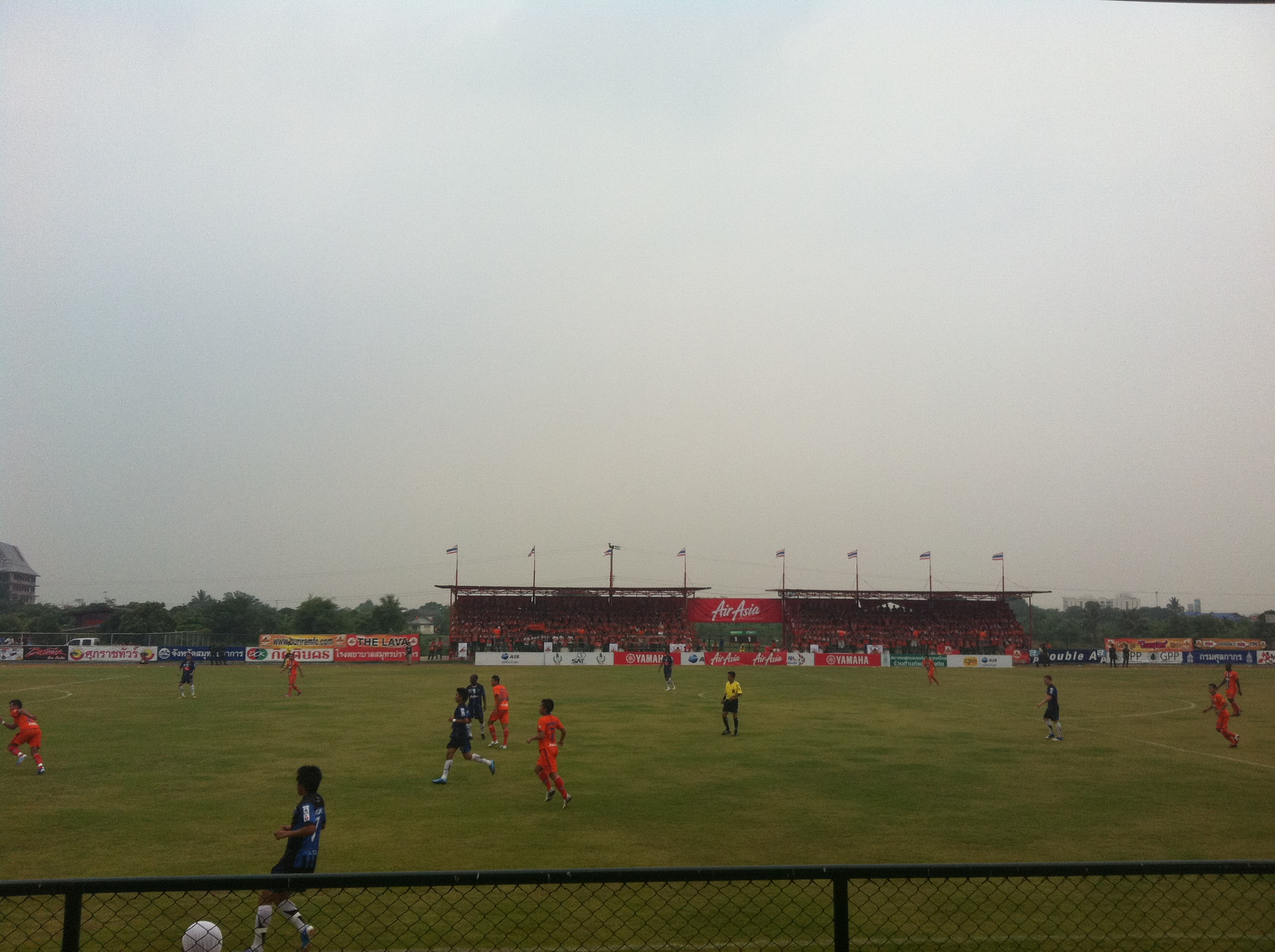
- Interactive map of Lad Krabang 54 Stadium
- Location: Bang Phli, Samut Prakan, Thailand
- Coordinates: 13°42′22″N 100°47′02″E
- Owner: Thai Customs Department
- Operator: Thai Customs Department
- Capacity: 2,000
- Surface: Grass

Construction
- Opened: 2009

Tenant
- Customs United F.C.

Lad Krabang 54 Stadium or Customs Department Stadium (Thai: สนามลาดกระบัง 54) หรือ (Thai: สนามกีฬากรมศุลกากร) is a football stadium in Bang Phli, Samut Prakan, Thailand. It used as the home ground of Customs United F.C. and Samut Prakan F.C. The stadium has a total capacity of 2,000. The main stand has a capacity of 1,500 and the away stand has a capacity of 500. The stadium is referred as Forza stadium by the fans of both teams.
