= Joachim Grassi =

Austro-Hungarian architect (1837–1904)

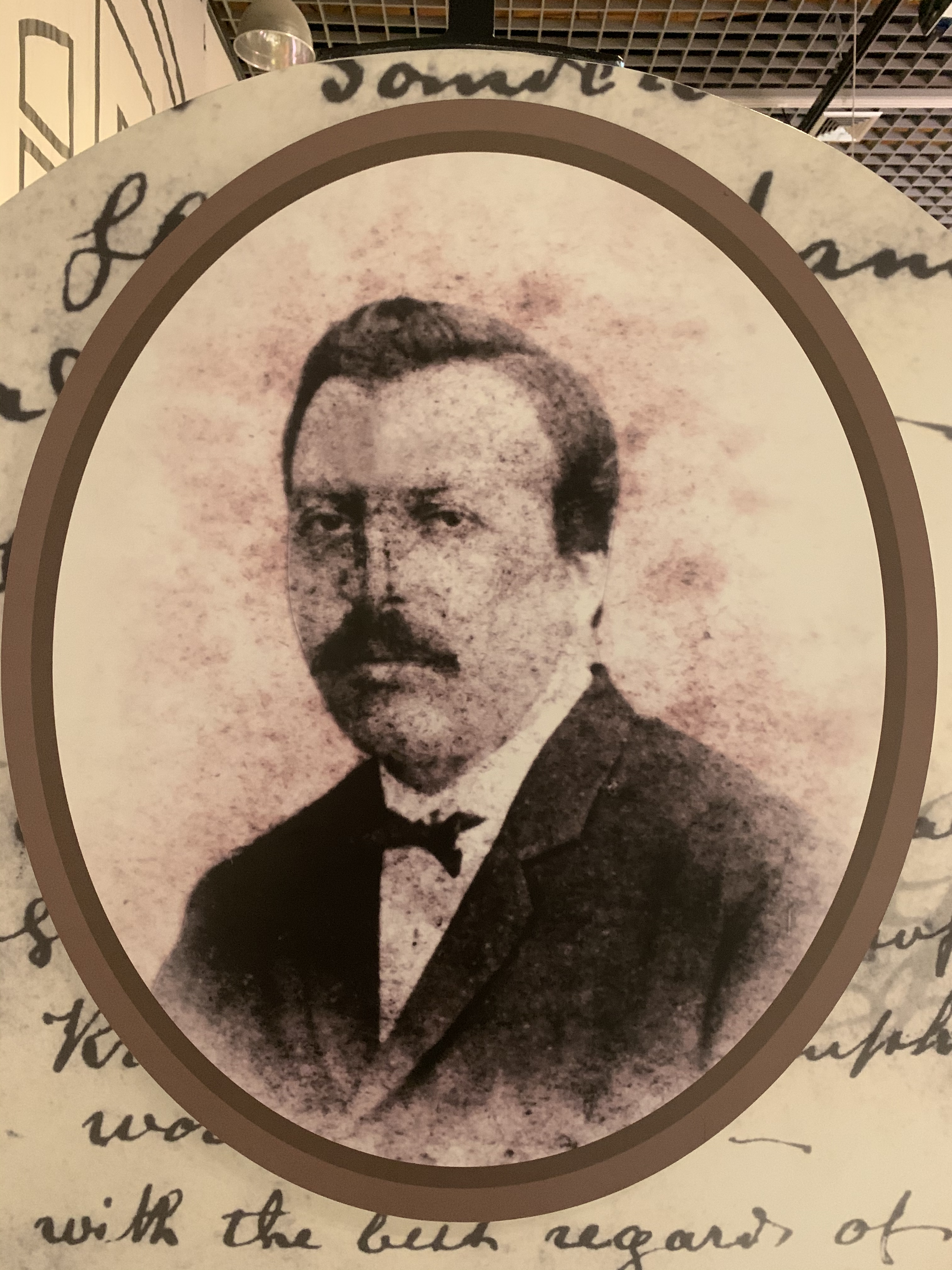
- Born: 1837; Capodistria (present-day Koper, Slovenia)
- Died: 19 August 1904 (aged 67); Capodistria
- Citizenship: Austrian, French (naturalized)
- Occupation: Architect
- Spouses: Lucie Nho; Amalia Stölker
- Children: 5

Joachim Grassi (Italian spelling Gioachino, 1837 – 19 August 1904) was an Austrian (later French) architect of Italian descent who worked for the Siamese government in the late nineteenth century. He was among the first European architects employed by King Chulalongkorn (Rama V), and contributed extensively to Siam (now known as Thailand)'s architecture, especially the Neo-Classic, during the time of its modernization.

== Biography ==
Grassi was born in Capodistria under the Austrian Empire (in present-day Koper, Slovenia). He moved from Shanghai to Bangkok and in 1870 he joined Bonneville, a French timber merchant firm in Thailand. Outlook in timber business wasn't bright for him but before he decided to leave the country, he got the contract to build the Concordia Club - the first foreigner club in Bangkok.

Joachim Grassi married Lucie Nho in Siam and had three sons, Felix Auguste Grassi (1880), Eugène Cesar (1881-1941) and Georges Raphael (1884). He received French nationality in 1883. Around 1875, Grassi Brothers & Co., his civil engineers company was established with his two brothers, Antonio and Giacomo Grassi, situated on the Chao Phraya River in Khlong San area opposite of the British Embassy then, providing architectural and construction services.

In 1893, amid the conflict between Thailand and France, he sold his company, Grassi Brothers & Co. to Mr. Edward Bonnevillie and went back to his home town in Capodistria. He married Amalia Stölker, sister of Julius Stölker one of the partners in Grassi Brother & Co. and had two children. Joachim Grassi died on August 19, 1904, at the age of 68 in Capodistria.

== Works ==
Grassi Brothers & Co.'s architectural and construction achievements in Thailand include:

- Concordia Club, built around 1873 or earlier, the first (French) club in Siam, on Charoenkrung road near Rhongpasi lane, later changed to Hotel de la Prix and was long since demolished.
- Bang Pa-in Palace (some of the buildings such as Warophat-Phiman throne hall (1872), Devaraj-Kunlai gate)
- Wat Niwet Thammaprawat, 1873–1875, a Buddhist temple in gothic style with a church tower in Bang Pa-in.
- Residence of Phraya Rajanupraphan (Sudjai and Thui Bunnag), son of the Chaophraya Phanuwong Mahakosathibodi (Thuam Bunnag), circa. early 1870s
- Residence of Chaophraya Surawong Waiyawat (Wora Bunnag)
- Portuguese Ambassador's Residence (Portuguese Consulate in Bangkok), 1875
- Buraphaphirom Palace, 1875–1880, demolished to give way to a market.
- Prince Saisanitwong Palace, 1875-1882
- Prince Svasti Sobhon Palace, 1876-1877
- Prince Rajasakdi Samosorn Palace
- Saphan Than Palace, circa 1879
- Courts of Justice, 1880-1882
- Tha Phra Palace, 1880-1883
- Statue of Queen Sunanda at Saranrom Park, 1880
- Sunandalaya School, 1880
- Printing house at Chang Rong Si Bridge, 1881-1882
- Residence of Chao Muen Wai Woranat, 1881–1882, was demolished and became Dusit Thani hotel
- New Pratumwan Palace (Windsor Palace or Wang Klang Thung or Wang Mai), 1881–1884, as the residence of the Crown Prince Vajirunhis, later became part of Chulalongkorn University and was later demolished to make way for the construction of Suphachalasai Stadium.
- Royal Barrack (Front soldier barracks), 1882–1884, now the Ministry of Defence
- Cavalry barracks, 1883 or early
- Conception Church bell tower, 1883
- Saint Joseph Church, 1883–1891, in Ayutthaya province.
- Customs House, 1884–1887, a neo-paladian group of buildings next to the French Embassy on Chao Phraya river.
- Chulachomklao Fort, 1884–1893, Samutprakarn province
- Henry Alabaster tomb monument in the Bangkok Protestant Cemetery, 1885
- Assumption College old school building, 1887-1890
- Victoria and Saovabhak Buildings at Siriraj Hospital, 1888
- Hongkong and Shanghai Bank, 1888–1890, the first establishment on the mouth of Khlong Phadung Krung Kasem, was demolished and now is the site of the Royal Orchid Sheraton Hotel.
- Old Bangkok Remand Prison (Bangkok maximum security prison), 1888–1891, on Maha Chai Road

Other works:

- Siam River Steamboat Company
- Railway in Singapore
- Antonio Grassi's tomb monument in Koper, Slovenia, 1887
- Irrigation System Plan for Chaopraya river basin under Siam Lands, Canal and Irrigation Co., Ltd.
- Rangsit Prayurasakdi Canal construction,1890
- Railway in Malacca, 1898

== Gallery ==
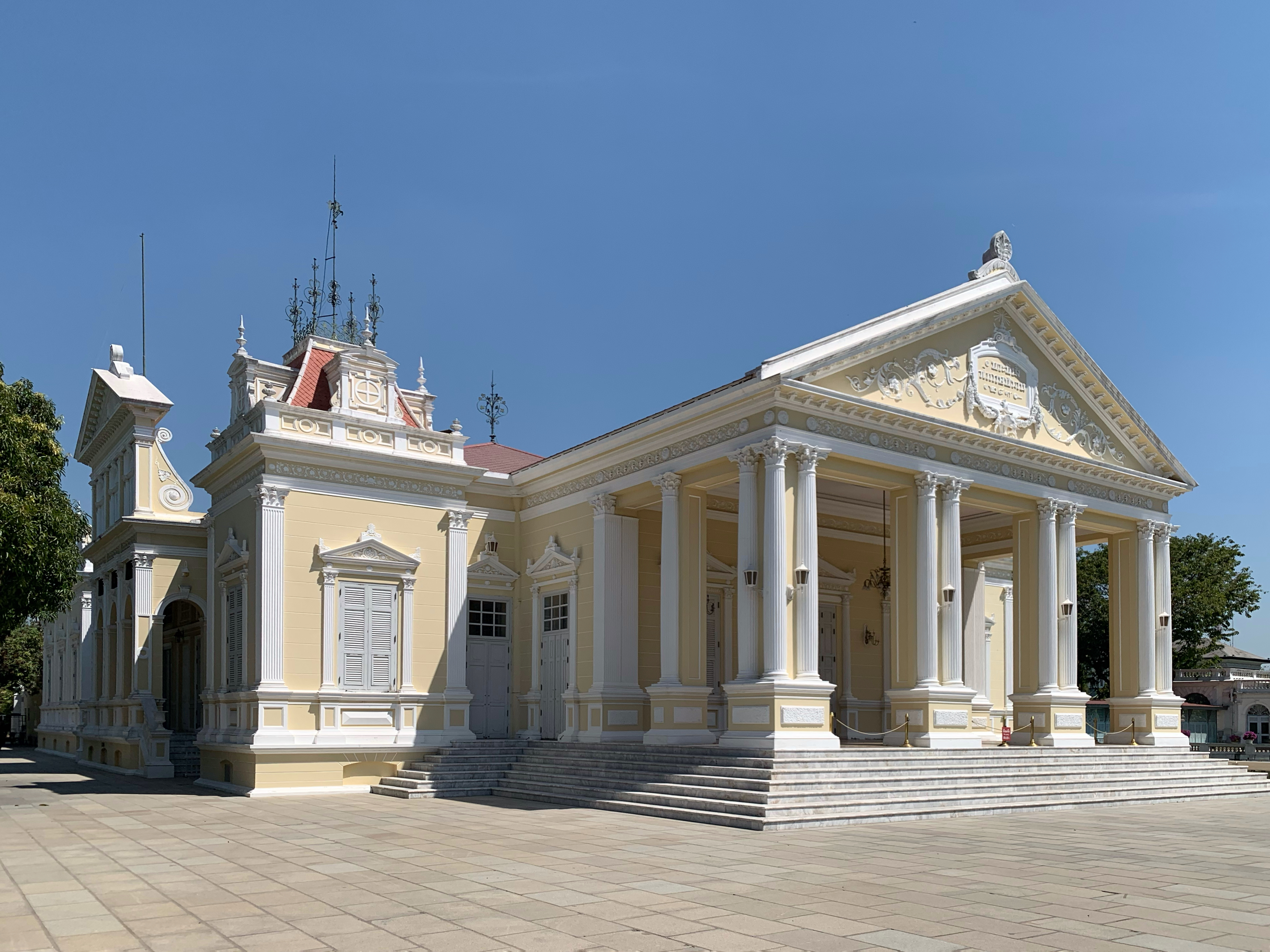
Warophat Phiman Throne Hall

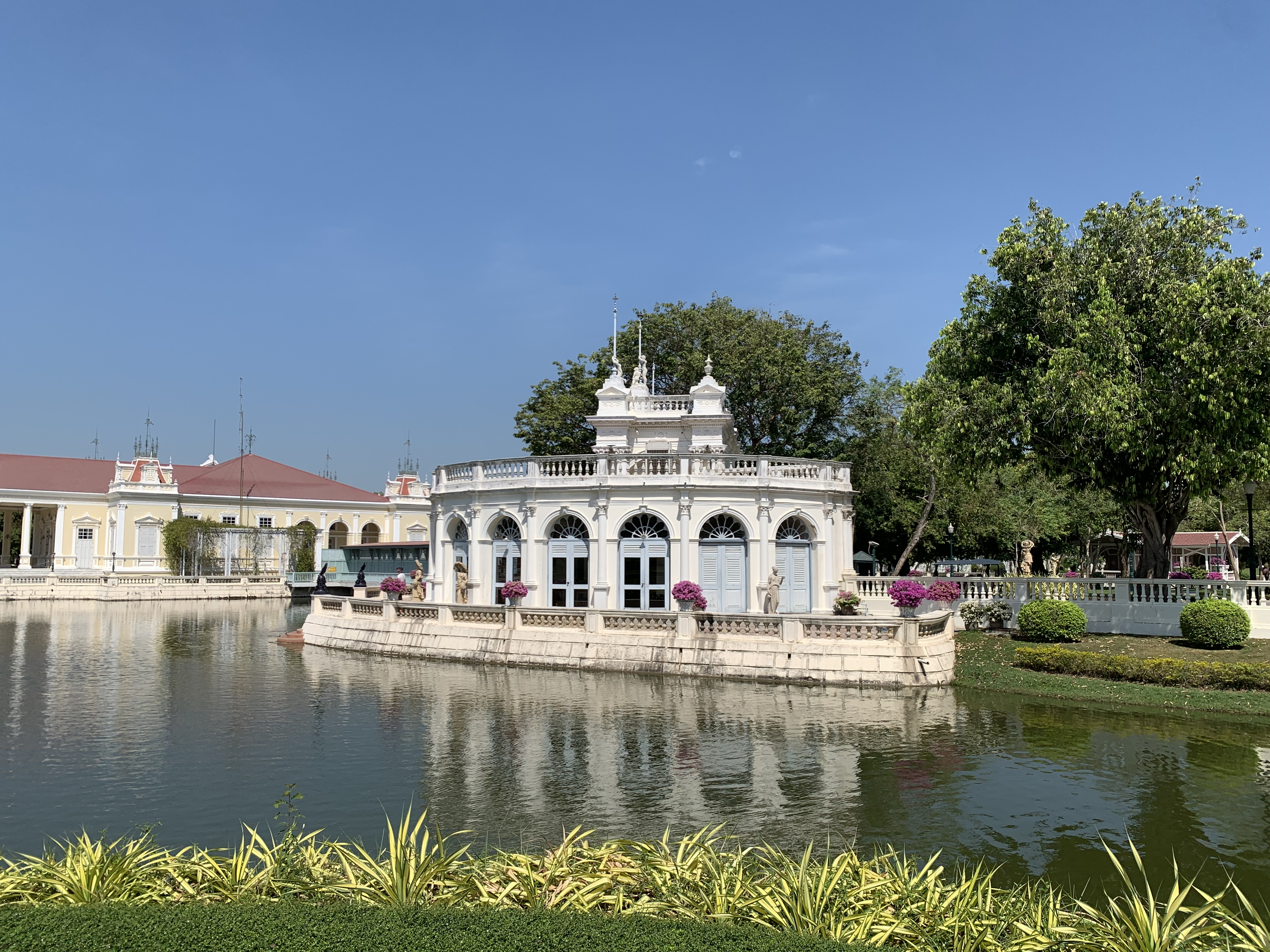
Thewarat Khanlai Gate (also rendered as Devaraj Kunlai Gate)

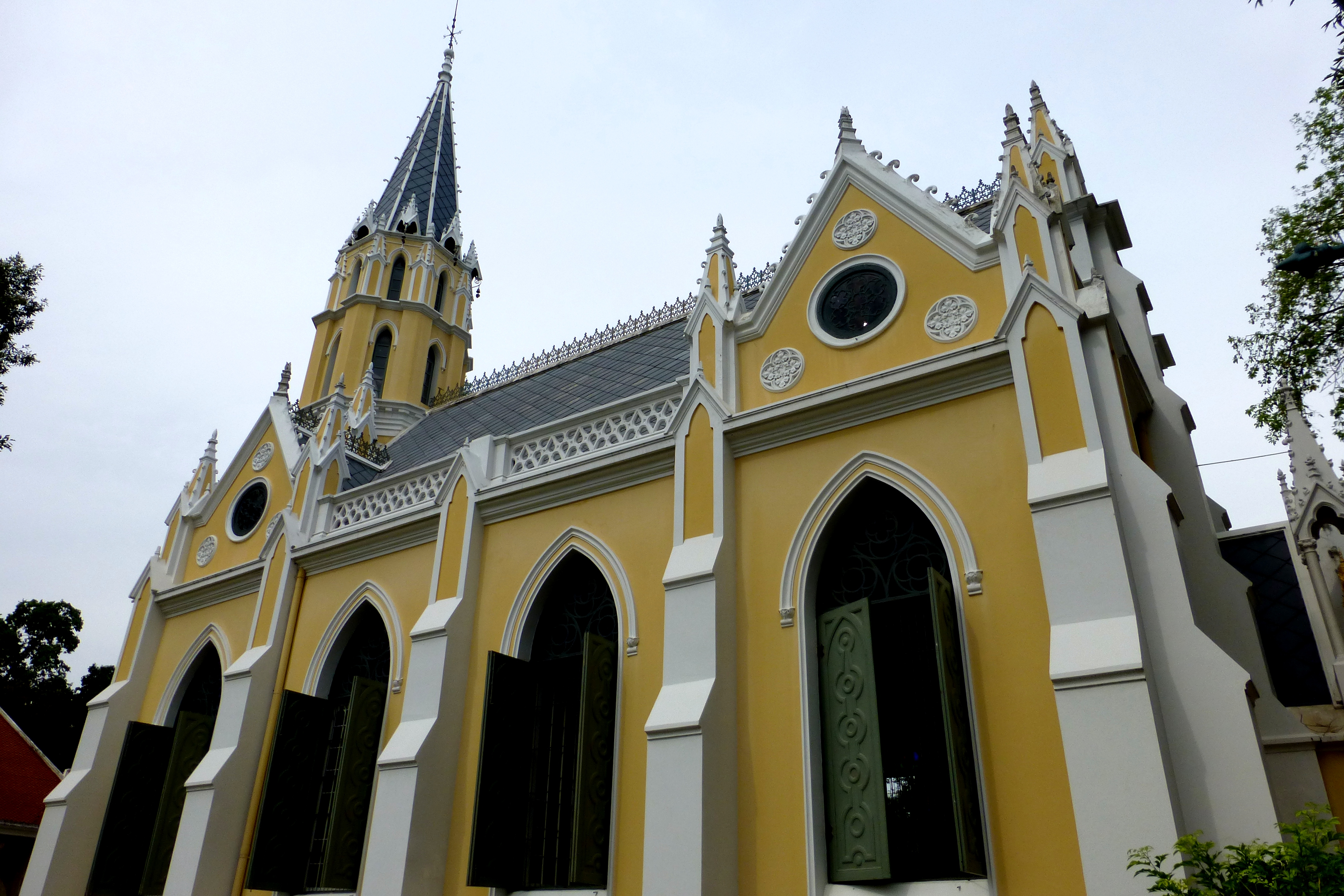
Wat Niwet Thammaprawat

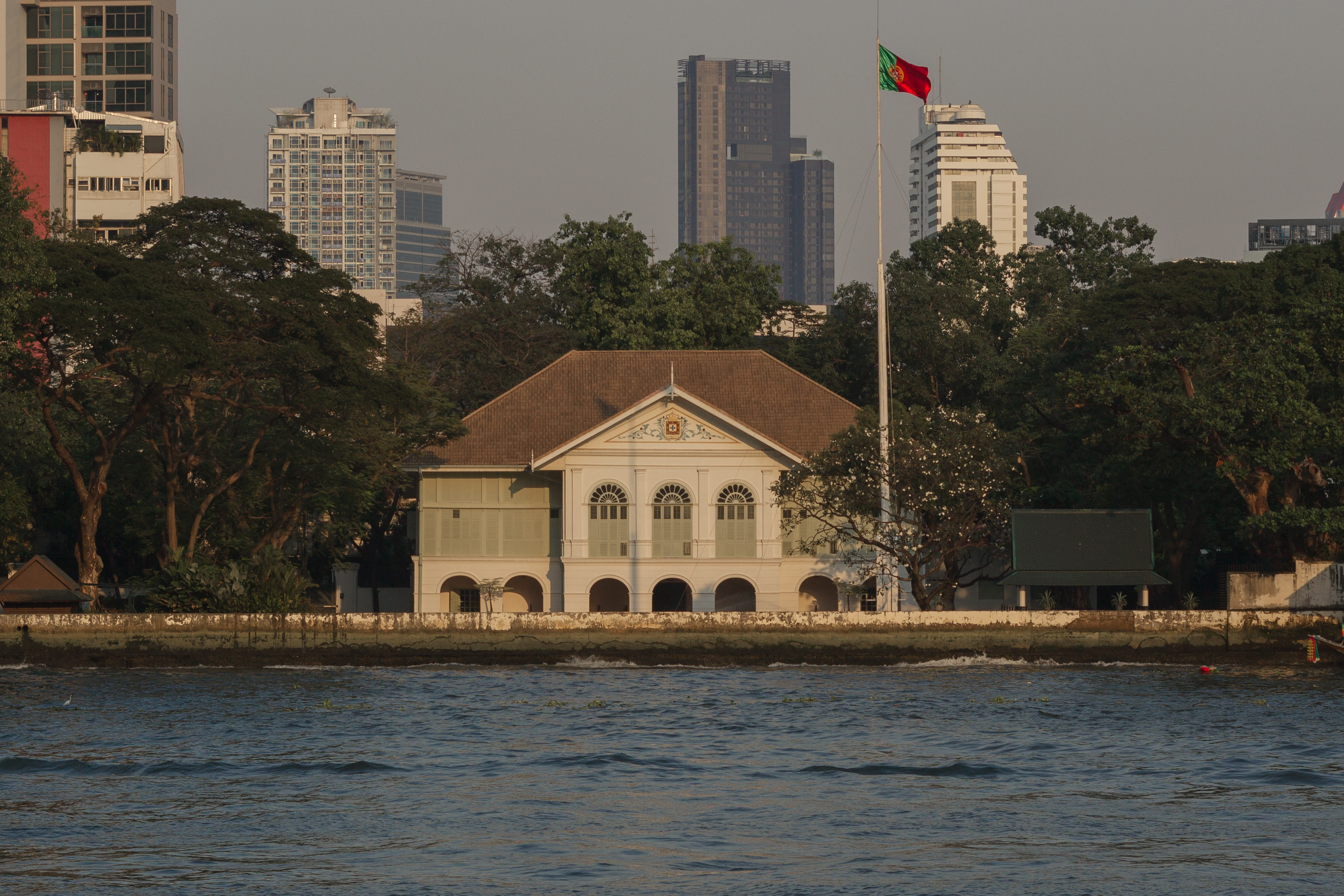
Portuguese Embassy in Bangkok

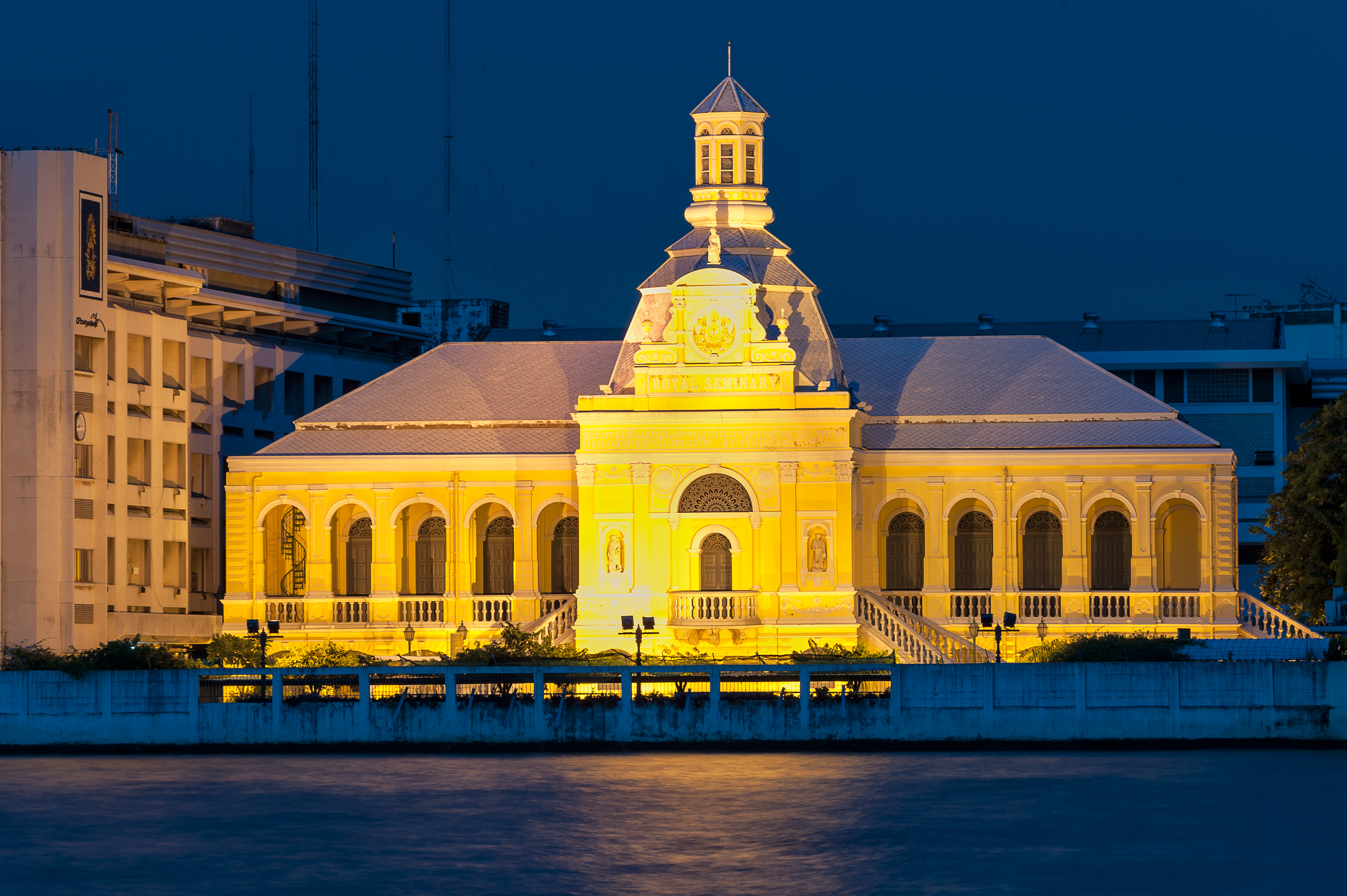
Sunandalaya Building, Rajini School

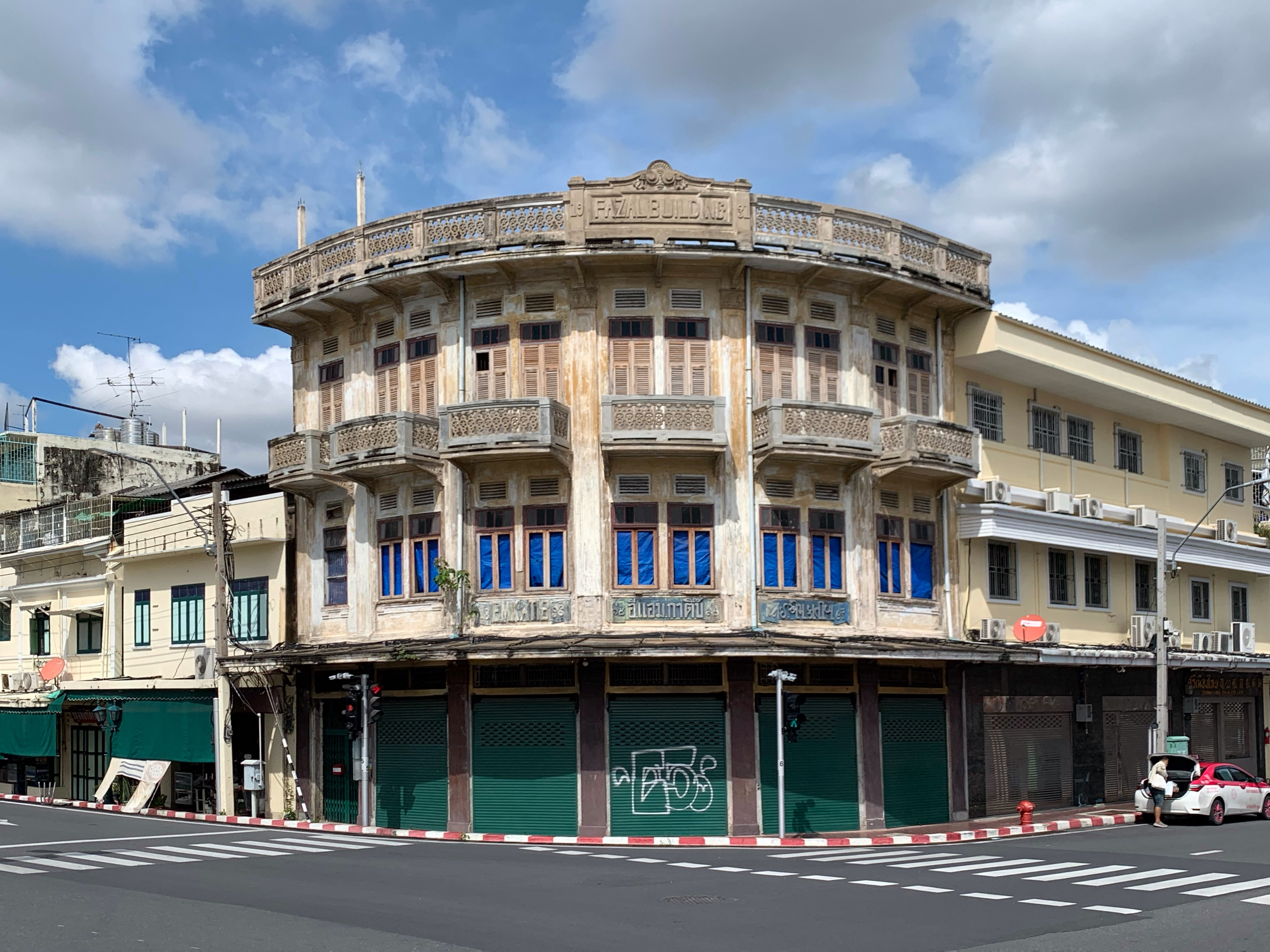
The building by the Chang Rongsi Bridge

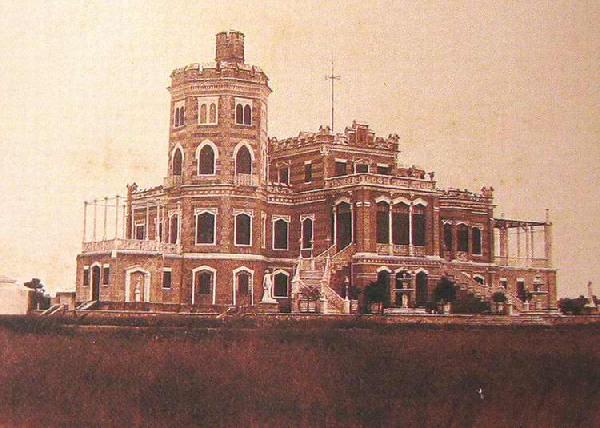
Windsor Palace

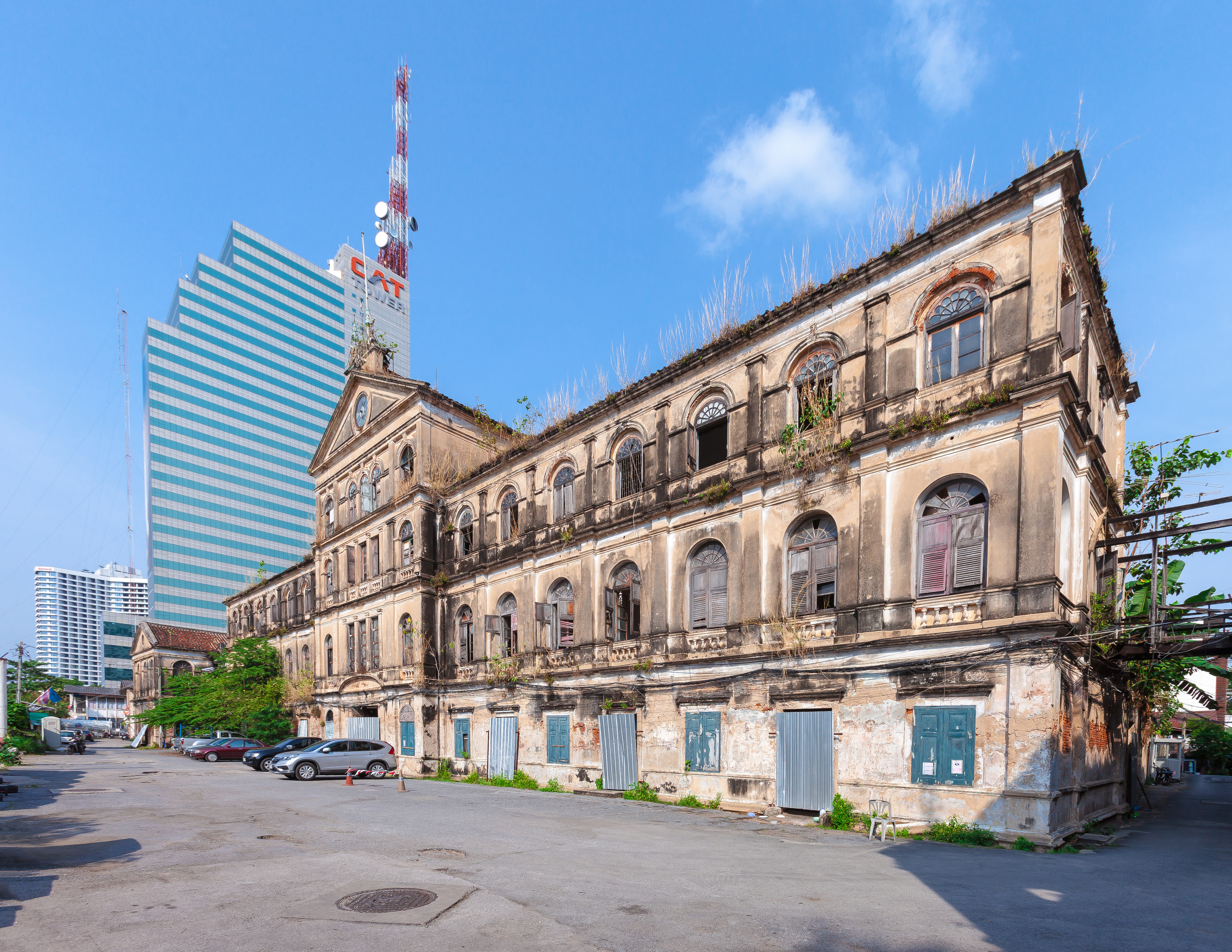
Customs House

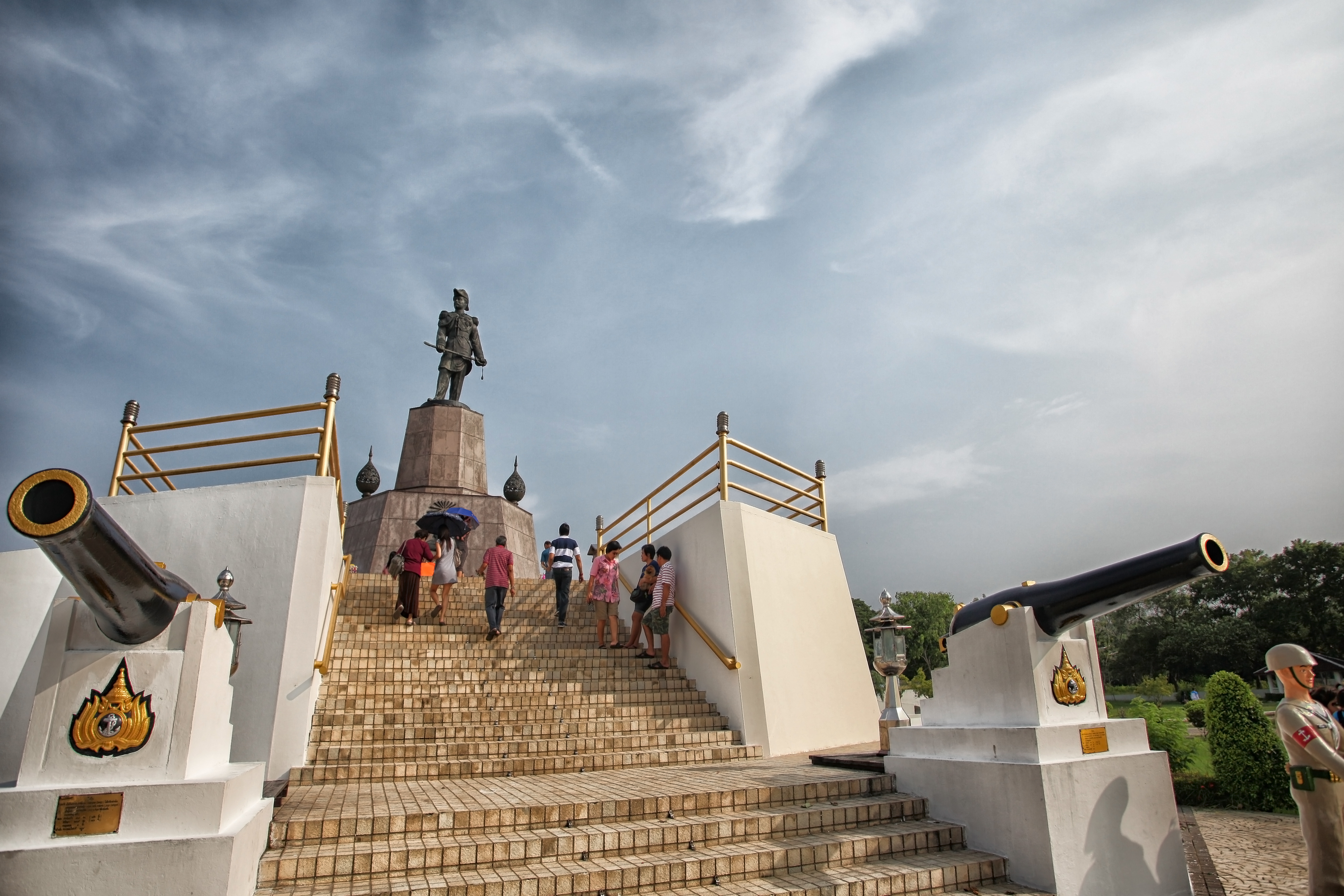
Chulachomklao Fort

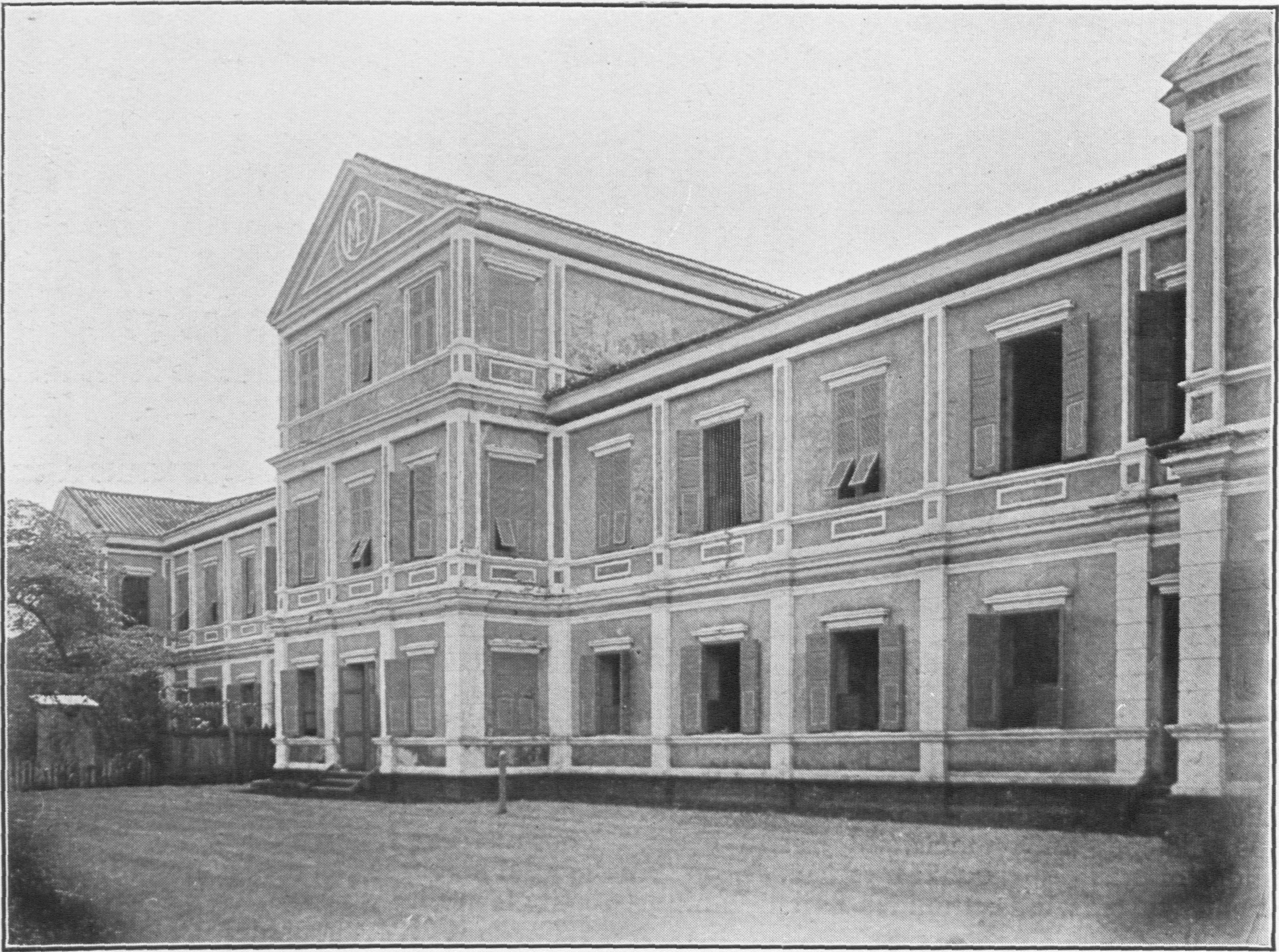
Old Building of Assumption College

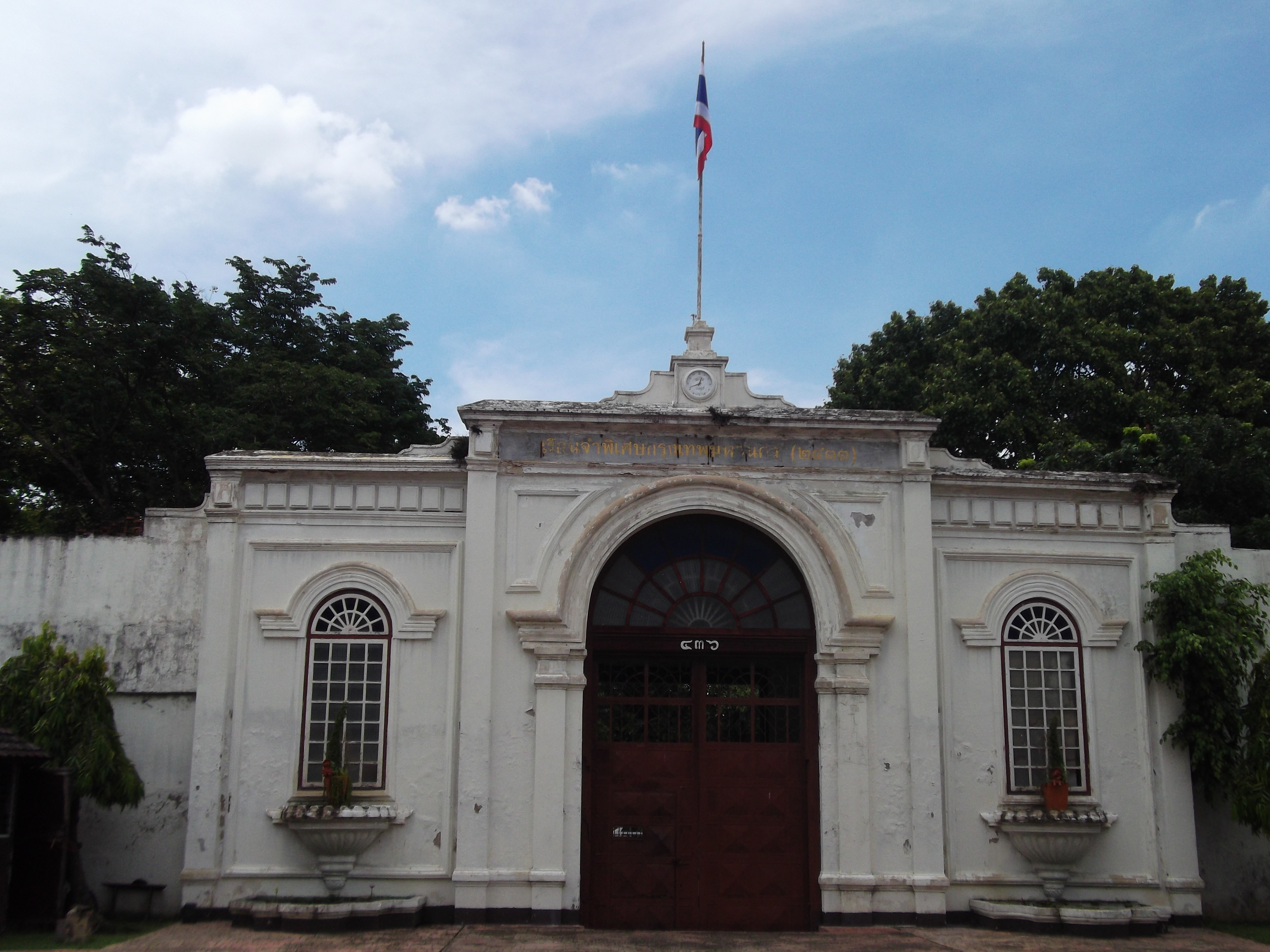
Bangkok Remand Prison
