= Jean-Baptiste Pallegoix =

Jean-Baptiste Pallegoix M.E.P.
- Vicar Apostolic of Eastern Siam
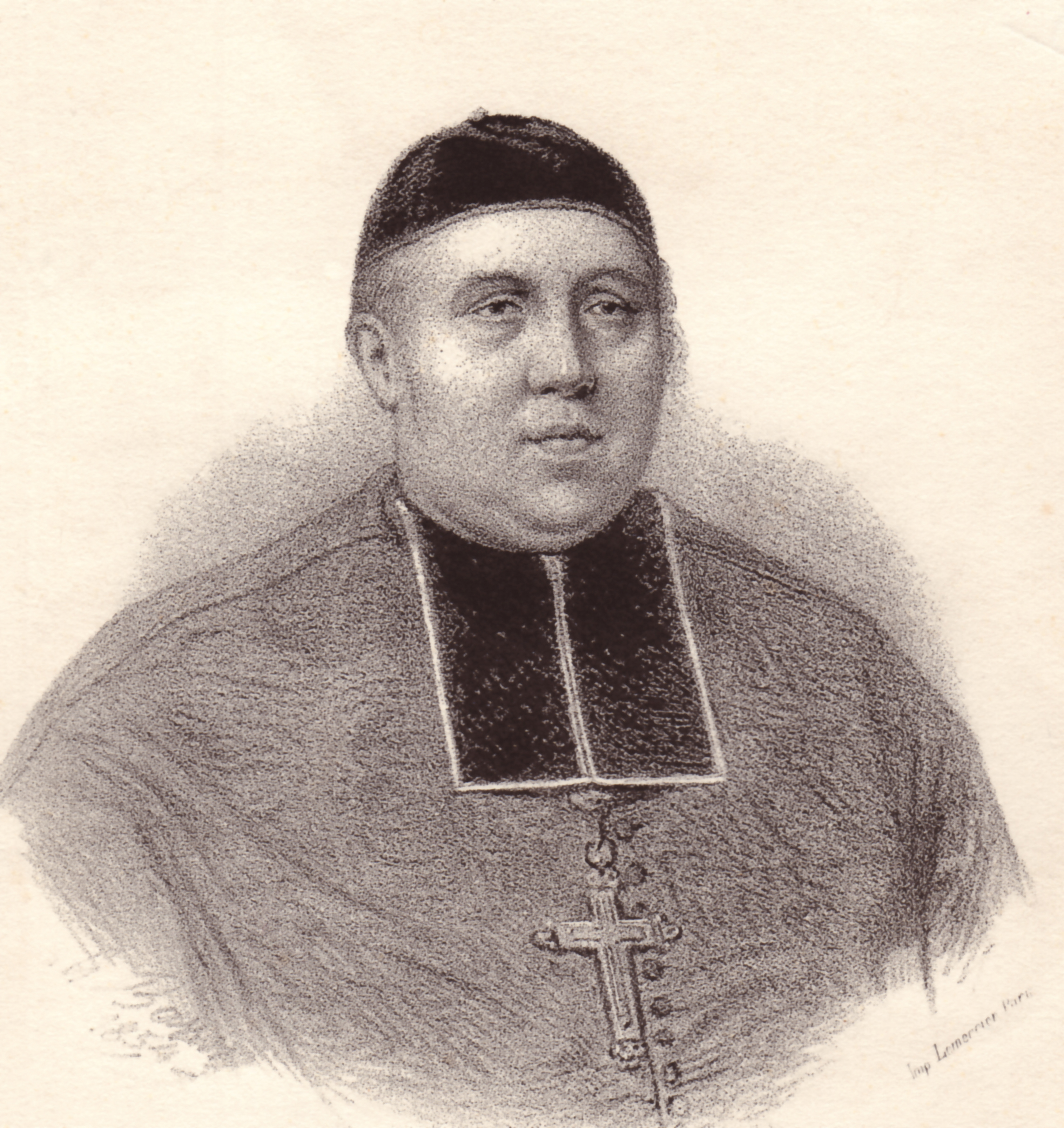
- Jean-Baptiste Pallegoix in Siam, 1854
- Church: Catholic Church
- See: Apostolic Vicariate of Eastern Siam
- In office: 10 September 1841 – 18 June 1862
- Predecessor: Jean-Paul-Hilaire-Michel Courvezy
- Successor: Aimé Dupond
- Other post: Titular Bishop of Mallus (1838-1862)
- Previous post: Coadjutor Vicar Apostolic of Siam (1838-1841)

Orders
- Ordination: 31 May 1828
- Consecration: 3 June 1838 by Jean-Paul-Hilaire-Michel Courvezy

Personal details
- Born: 24 October 1805 Combertault, Côte-d'Or, French Republic
- Died: 18 June 1862 (aged 56) Bangkok, Kingdom of Siam

Jean-Baptiste Pallegoix, M.E.P. (French pronunciation: [ʒɑ̃ batist palɡwa]; 24 October 1805 – 18 June 1862) was vicar apostolic of Eastern Siam.

Born in Combertault, France, he was consecrated as a priest of the Société des Missions Etrangères on 31 May 1828. On 3 June 1838 he was assigned as Coadjutor Vicar Apostolic of Siam and titular bishop of Mallus. He was consecrated the same day by Bishop Jean-Paul-Hilaire-Michel Courvezy, the vicar apostolic of Siam. On 10 September 1841 he succeeded Courvezy and became vicar apostolic of Eastern Siam.

Bishop Pallegoix was highly esteemed by King Mongkut and they often discussed issues. The king personally assisted at Pallegoix's funeral.

== Writings ==
- Description du Royaume Thai (Thai: เรื่องเล่ากรุงสยาม)

The government of Siam is despotic in the full significance of the term. The King is feared and respected almost like a God. Nobody dares look him in the face. When the courtiers attend audiences they remain prostrated on their knees and elbows. When His Majesty passes somewhere, everybody throws himself to the ground and those who would not do this surely risk to have their eyes punctured by the archers who precede and who launch quite skillfully earthen balls with the bow they always hold ready flexed.

— Jean-Baptiste Pallegoix, first paragraph of the chapter "On the Government of the Thai"

- Dictionarium linguae Thaĭ sive Sa̱mensis interpretatione Latina, Gallica et Anglica illustratum (Thai: สัพพะ พะจะนะ พาสา ไท); Paris 1854, Reprint: Farnborough 1972.
- Siamese French English Dictionary (Thai: ศริพจน์ภาษาไทย); Bangkok 1898.
