= Queen Sirikit Museum of Textiles =

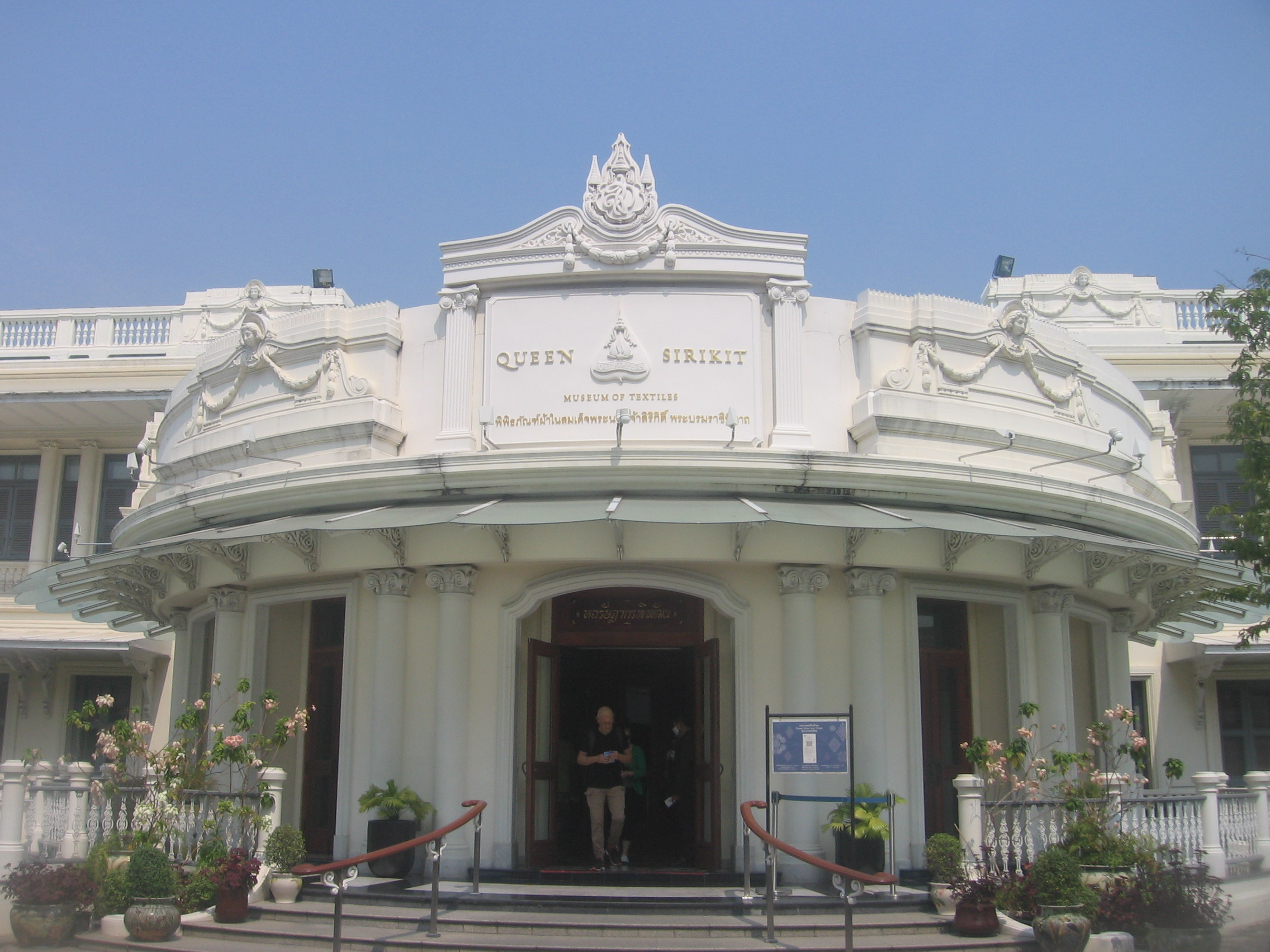

- Location in Bangkok
- Former name: Ratsadakorn-bhibhathana Building
- Established: 1873; 153 years ago
- Location: Grand Palace, Bangkok
- Coordinates: 13.75195821562753°N 100.49073216326734°E
- Type: History museum, Textile museum
- Owner: Vajiralongkorn
- Website: www.qsmtthailand.org

The Queen Sirikit Museum of Textiles (Thai: พิพิธภัณฑ์ผ้าในสมเด็จพระนางเจ้าสิริกิติ์ พระบรมราชินีนาถ, RTGS: Phiphitthaphan Pha Nai Somdet Phra Nang Chao Sirikit Phra Borommarachini Nat) is a museum located in the Grand Palace in Bangkok, Thailand. The museum replaced the 1873 Ratsadakorn-bhibhathana Building (Thai: หอรัษฎากรพิพัฒน์; RTGS: Ho Ratsadakon Phiphat, lit. 'Hall of the Grow Revenue') of the Royal Treasury Ministry by a request of Queen Sirikit in 2003. The building was the original organization of the current Crown Property Bureau.

== History ==
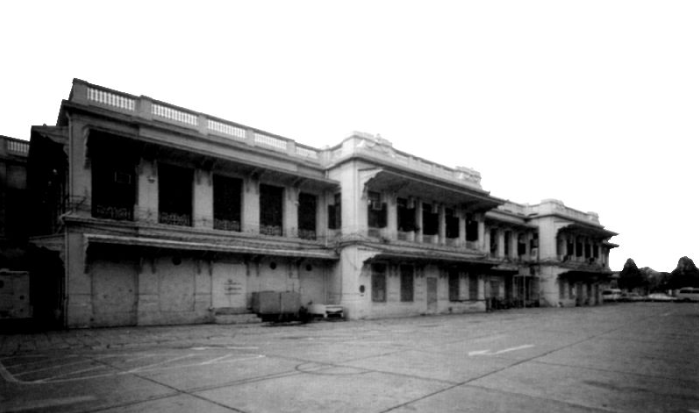
Ratsadakorn-bhibhathana Building in 1900s

King Chulalongkorn planned to set up a centralized taxing system in Siam. Chulalongkorn established the Ratsadakorn-bhibhathana building on 4 June 1873 to improve efficiency, It later became the Customs Department. The organization and management became more effective under the control of the Royal Treasury Ministry and the Ministry of Finance.

Chulalongkorn appointed Chaturonrasmi to lead the organization. The building was designed and built by an Italian. The Crown Property Bureau, which originally collected the monarchy's assets. One of the purposes was to counter the influence of the Bunnag family who had been in control of wealth collection since early Rattanakosin.

In 1875, the Royal Treasury Ministry was established at the Ratsadakorn-bhibhathana Building.

== Textile museum ==
Queen Sirikit requested permission to renovate a vacant building in 2003 to be a textile museum.

== See also ==
- Calico Museum of Textiles
