= Windsor Palace (Bangkok) =

Former royal residence in Thailand

Coordinates: 13.745°N 100.526°E

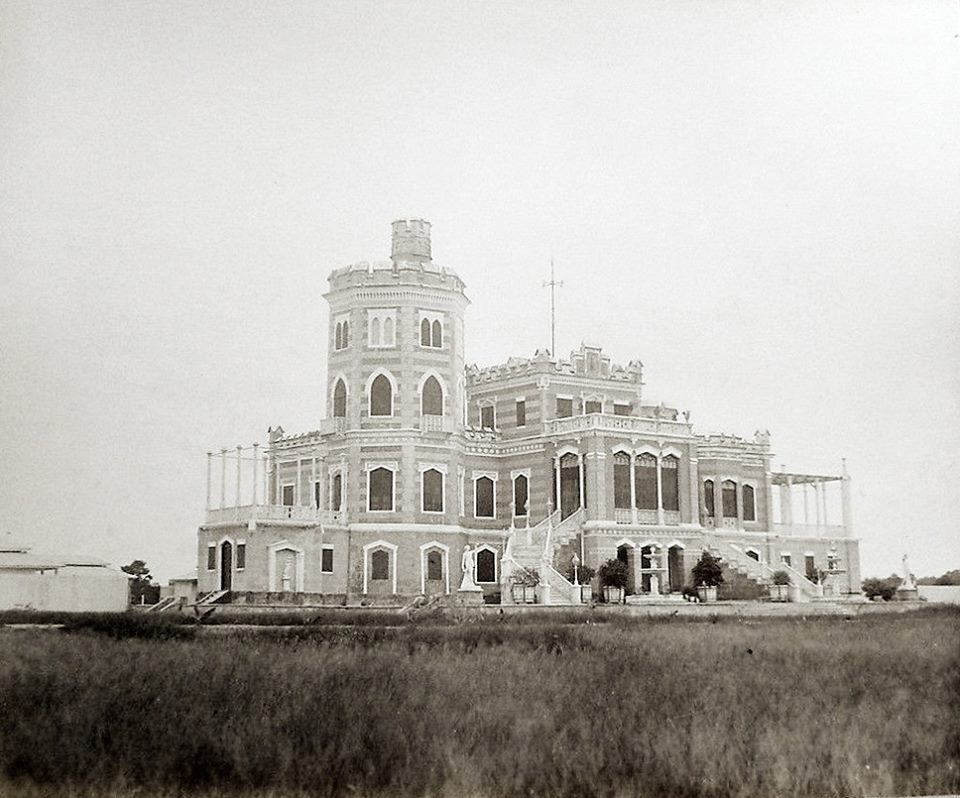
Windsor Palace, shortly after its construction

Windsor Palace was situated in Bangkok, Thailand, during the early twentieth century. Built on the orders of King Chulalongkorn (Rama V) to serve as the residence of Crown Prince Vajirunhis, the palace later became part of Chulalongkorn University but was later demolished to make way for the construction of Suphachalasai Stadium. The palace became known as such to foreign residents of Bangkok due to its partial resemblance to Windsor Castle, though it was also known to locals as Wang Klang Thung or Wang Mai.

== History ==
Windsor Palace was commissioned by King Chulalongkorn in 1881 to serve as the residence of his eldest son, Prince Vajirunhis, who would later be named the first Crown Prince of Siam (Thailand). The palace was located on Sa Pathum Road (now Rama I Road) at the current location of Suphachalasai Stadium. Designed in Gothic Revival style by the Italian architect Joachim Grassi, its appearance reflects that of Windsor Castle in England, and the palace became known to contemporary expatriates as Windsor. Locals called the palace Wang Klang Thung (Thai: วังกลางทุ่ง), lit. palace in the field, for its location, or Wang Mai (วังใหม่), which means new palace. The latter name in turn gave rise to Wang Mai Subdistrict, which is part of Pathum Wan District and covers the area where the palace was located. The palace had three main storeys and a central staircase, was built with imported marble, and internal decorations included neoclassical columns and statues.

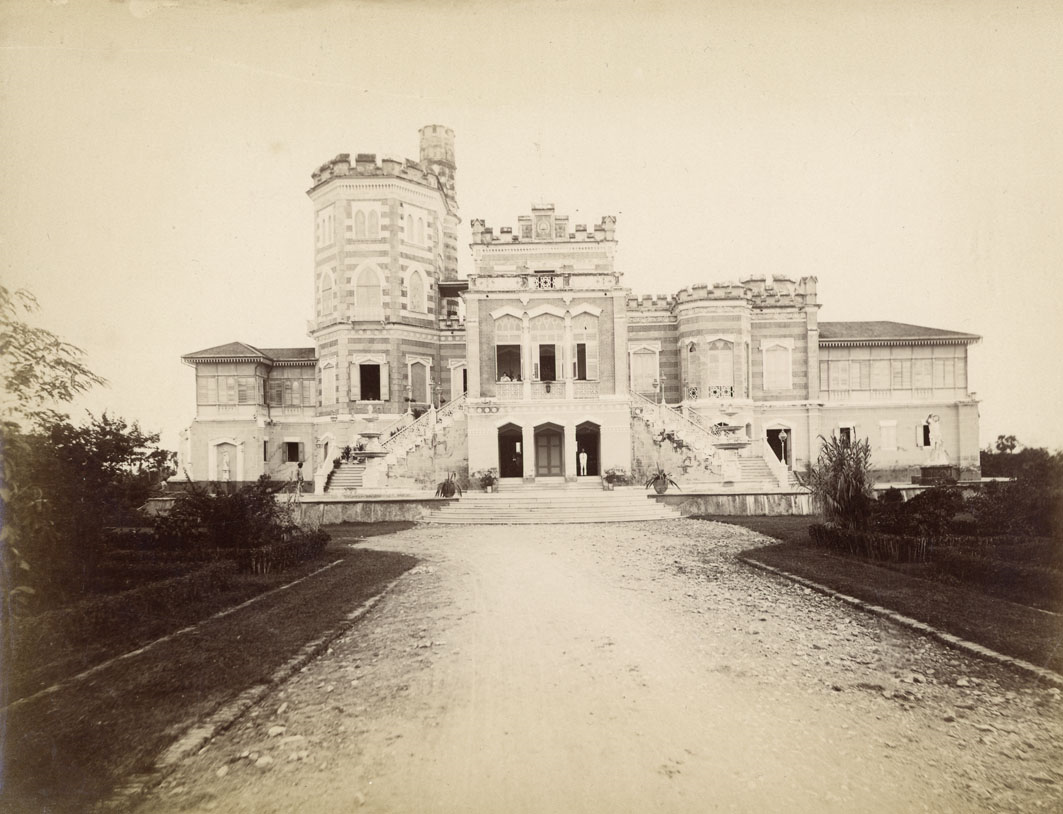
The palace, probably during its use by the Cartography School

The palace's foundation stone was laid in November 1881, and construction was completed in July 1884. However, Prince Vajirunhis continued to live in the Grand Palace and had not moved into his new home when he died in 1895. Following the prince's death, the palace was used as a school of cartography, and later on, agriculture. When King Vajiravudh (Rama VI, who succeeded King Chulalongkorn) established the Civil Service College of King Chulalongkorn (later to become Chulalongkorn University) in 1911, ownership of the palace was transferred to the college and the palace became the seat of the college's School of Mechanical Sciences. In 1916 the college campuses were consolidated, and Windsor Palace served as the centre of the Prathum Wan Campus (which by now also hosted the Public Administration and Education Departments) while a new Administration Building (now the Faculty of Arts Building) was being constructed.

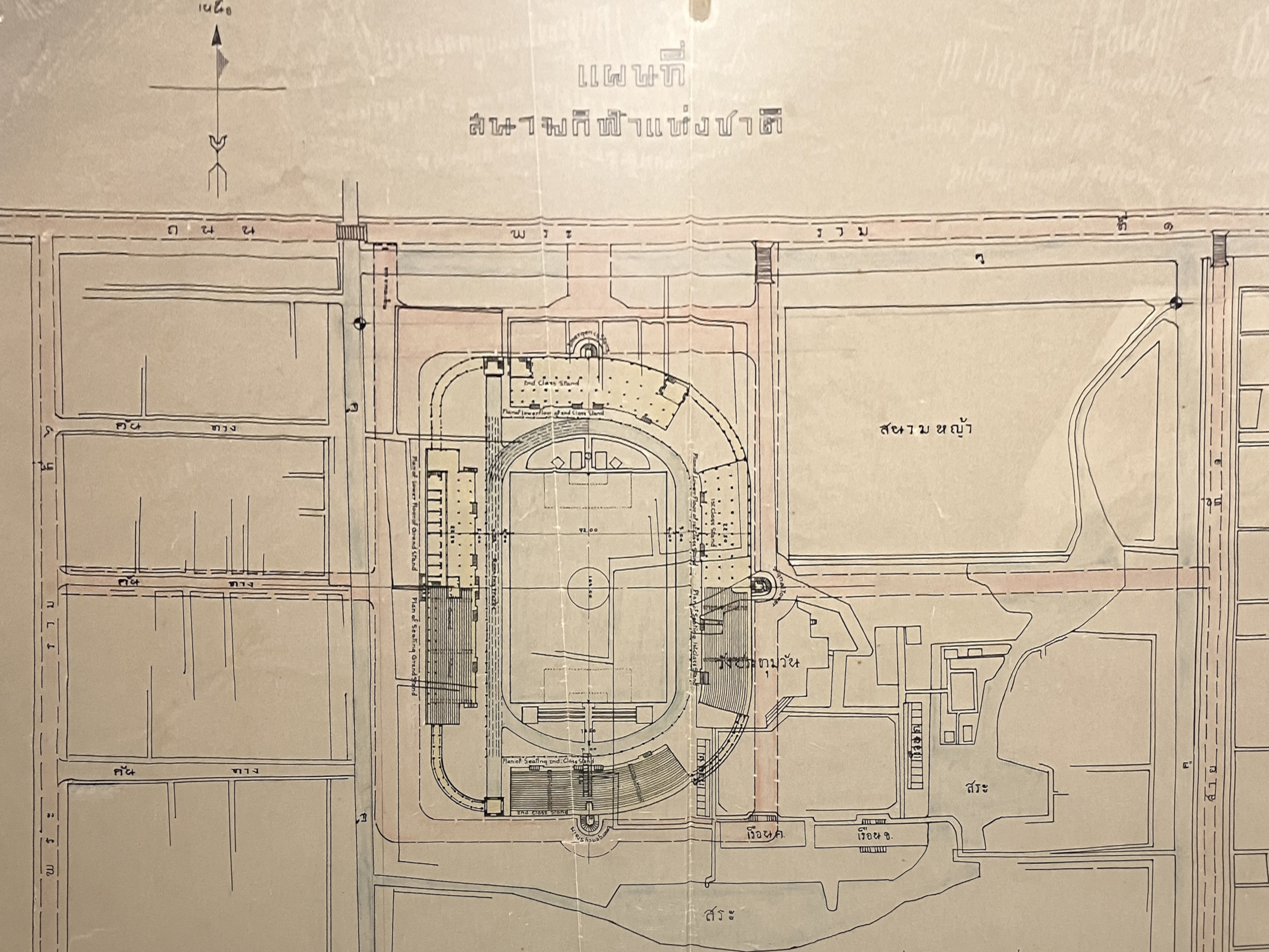
This layout plan for the National Stadium shows its location superimposed on a map of the palace grounds.

With the formal establishment of Chulalongkorn University in 1917, Windsor Palace became the seat of the Faculty of Arts and Science. The building was modified to hold classes and laboratories, with a cadaver dissection lab built nearby. It was also here at the palace that Prince Mahidol Adulyadej instructed medical students in pre-clinical courses. Four student dormitories were built near the palace building, and later became known as Ho Wang (หอวัง, lit. palace dormitory). The name was adopted by the university's teacher-training school, which was established nearby and became known as Horwang Secondary School of Chulalongkorn University. Use of the palace ceased in 1935 when the area was requested for construction of the National Stadium. The faculty was relocated, and Horwang School moved to the site that is now Triam Udom Suksa School.

== Demolition and excavation ==
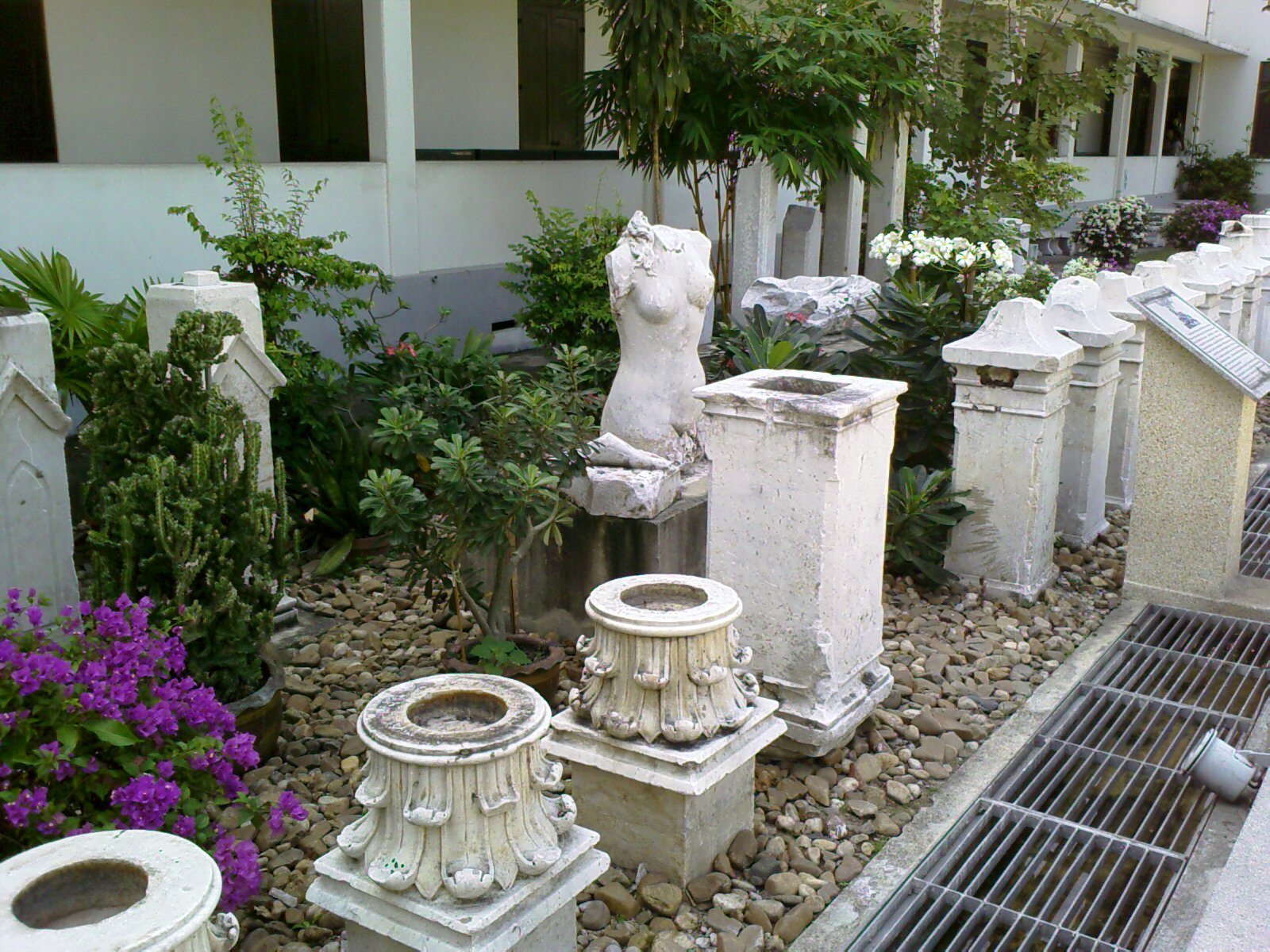
Marble fragments from the palace displayed at the Chulalongkorn University School of Sports Science

Following the Siamese Revolution of 1932 which abolished absolute monarchy, the property surrounding Windsor Palace was leased to the Ministry of Education's Department of Physical Education in 1935 to serve as the construction site for the National Stadium complex, with Suphachalasai Stadium at its core. The palace was subsequently demolished, and its existence faded from public knowledge.

Part of the National Stadium complex was established as the Central Physical Education School, which later became part of Srinakharinwirot University's Faculty of Physical Education. Ownership of these buildings was transferred to Chulalongkorn University's School of Sports Science when their lease expired in 1997. Later during renovations by Chulalongkorn University, fragments of marble columns and statues were discovered, and it was concluded that they originated from the palace structure. These are now on display at the School of Sports Science. Numerous marble fragments have also been found within the site of the National Stadium, but have been left lying around as debris. There have been calls for formal excavation and cataloguing, but no substantial developments have yet emerged.

On the eightieth anniversary of the establishment of Chulalongkorn University in 1997, a set of commemorative postage stamps was issued. Windsor Palace featured in one of the designs.
