= Customs House (Bangkok) =

Coordinates: 13°43′31″N 100°30′50″E

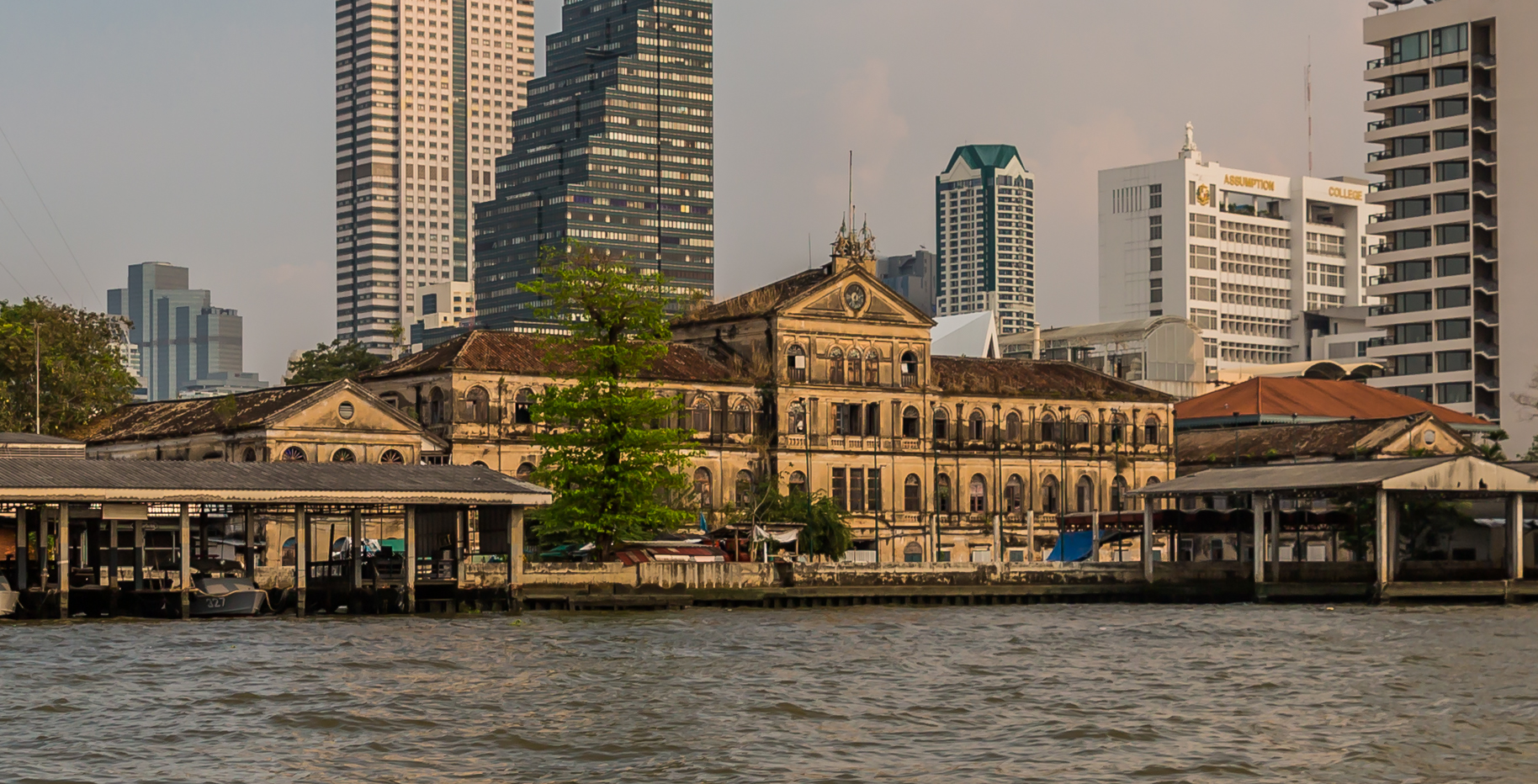
The Customs House in 2017

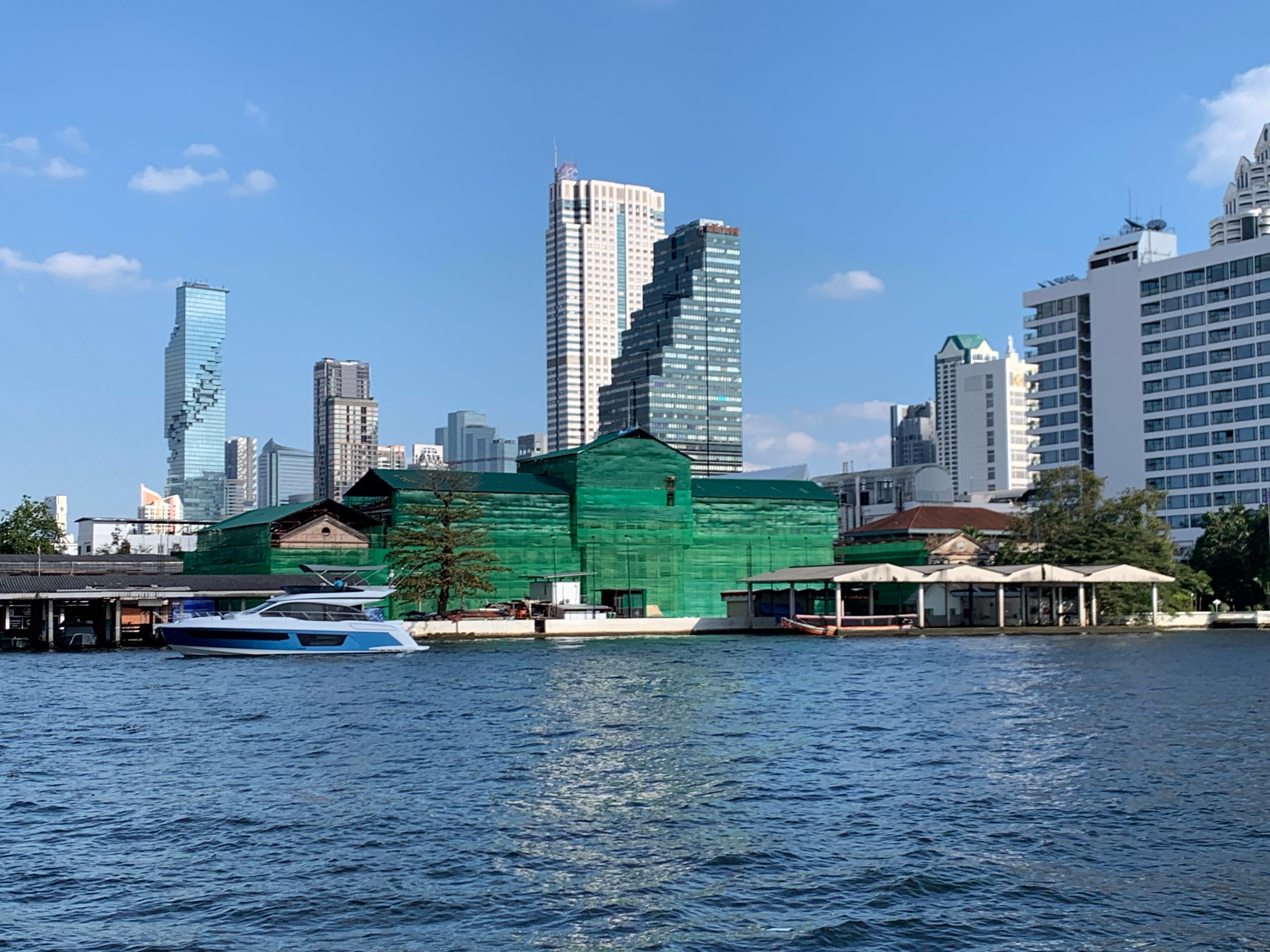
The Customs House in January 2022

The old Customs House (Thai: ศุลกสถาน, RTGS: Sunlakasathan) is a historic building in Bangkok, located on the eastern bank of the Chao Phraya River in Bang Rak District. It was built in 1888 as one of the many Western-style buildings commissioned by King Chulalongkorn, and was designed by Joachim Grassi in the neo-Palladian style. The building fell into disrepair during the mid-20th century. Beginning in 2019, it is undergoing restoration and re-development as a luxury hotel.

== History ==
The Customs House was built in 1888 to designs by Joachim Grassi. Built in the Palladian style, it is a fine example of the prevalent use of Western architecture in public buildings during Siam (Thailand)'s modernisation under the reign of King Chulalongkorn (Rama V). The building sits on the eastern bank of the Chao Phraya River in Bang Rak District, on Soi Charoen Krung 36, and was symbolically considered the gateway to the country.

In 1949, the customs office moved to Khlong Toei Port. The building later came to serve as headquarters of the Marine Police Division, and then residences for staff of the Bang Rak Fire Station. The building has much deteriorated since, and while multiple plans for its restoration were proposed, none came to fruition.

In 2005, real estate consortium Natural Park won a 30-year concession from the Treasury Department (which administers the building as state property) to renovate the site as an Aman Resorts hotel. However, in the ten years since, no development had taken place, due to difficulties in relocating the previous tenants. The residents finally moved out in early 2016, and the Treasury Department confirmed in 2017 that the project would go ahead under the U City company, as Natural Park was now known following restructuring.

U City, in a joint venture with Aman Resorts and Silverlink Resorts, signed the development contract on 29 May 2019, giving it a thirty-year lease of the property. U City plans to spend 3 billion baht (US$94 million) restoring and developing the property as a luxury hotel, slated to be completed by 2025. Work began with archaeological excavation and cataloguing in association with the Fine Arts Department. It was later announced that the site would be developed as a Langham hotel, and is scheduled for a 2026 opening.
