= Customs Department (Thailand) =

Customs Department กรมศุลกากร
- Flag of the Thai Customs Department

Agency overview
- Formed: 4 July 1874

Jurisdictional structure
- Operations jurisdiction: Thailand
- Specialist jurisdiction: Customs, excise, gambling

Operational structure
- Headquarters: Bangkok, Thailand
- Agency executive: Theeraj Athanavanich, Director-General
- Parent agency: Ministry of Finance

Website
- www.customs.go.th

The Customs Department, also called the Thai Customs or sometime Royal Thai Customs, is the customs department of Thailand under the Ministry of Finance.

== History ==
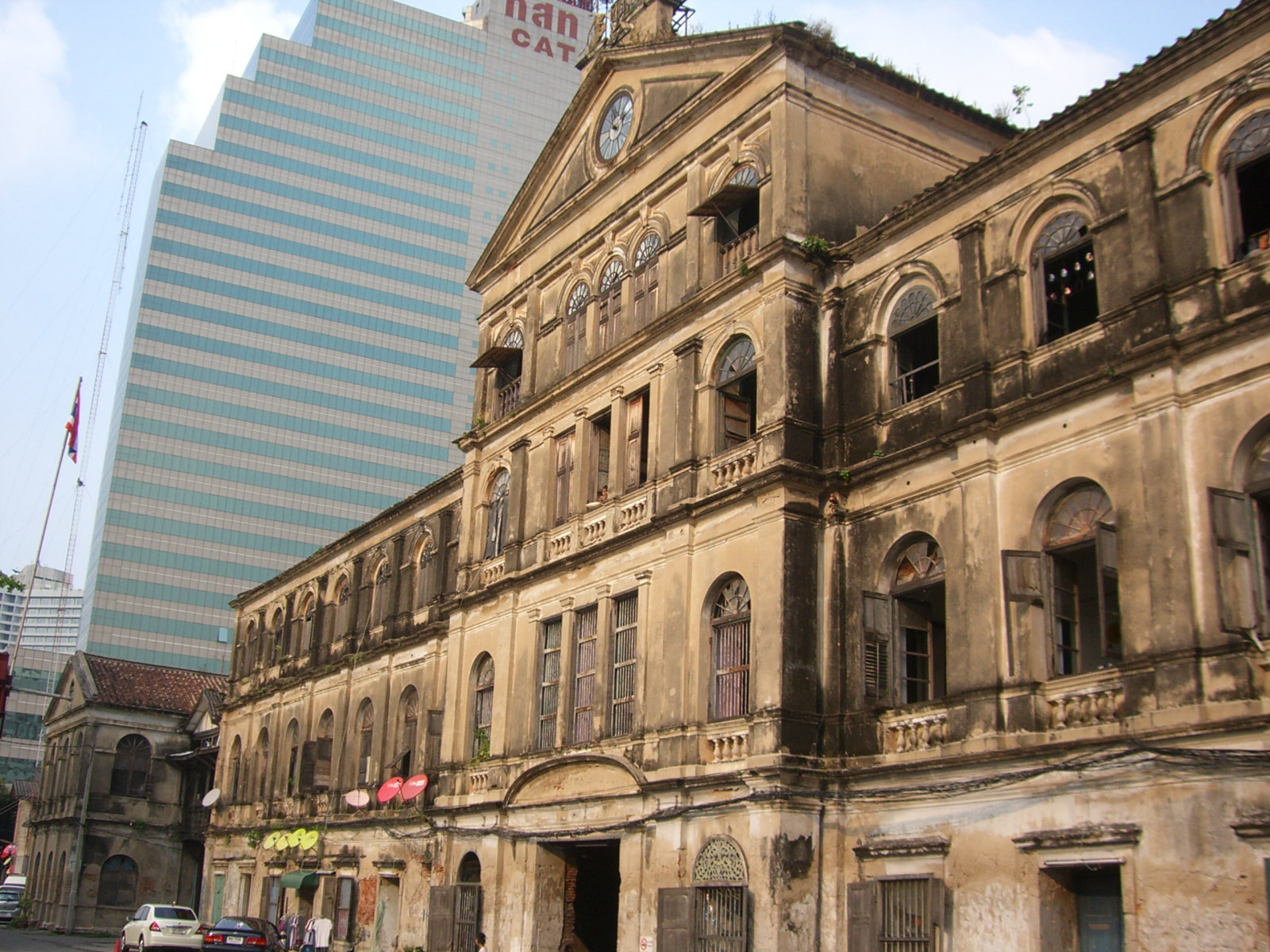
Old Customs House at Bang Rak District

On 4 July 1874, King Chulalongkorn established Hor Ratsadakorn Pipat to collect all types of tax and become a form of Custom Department. Since the customs policy was complicated, the Customs Department developed the organization and management to be more effective by corporate the department under the control of the Ministry of Finance by Finance Minister of Thailand.

== Organizational structure ==
- Central Administration Bureau
- Investigation and Suppression Bureau
- Human Resource Management Bureau
- Custom Standard Procedures and Valuation Bureau
- Custom Tariff Bureau
- Tax Incentives Bureau
- Legal Affairs Bureau
- Planning and International Affairs Bureau
- Information and Communication Technology Bureau
- Bangkok Customs Bureau
- Bangkok Port Bureau
- Laem Chabang Port Customs Bureau
- Suvarnabhumi Airport Passenger Control Customs Bureau
- Suvarnabhumi Airport Cargo Clearance Customs Bureau
- Lad Krabang Port Cargo Control Bureau
- Office of Customs Counsellor (Brussels)
- Office of Customs Counsellor (Hong Kong)
- Office of Customs Counsellor (Guangzhou)
- Regional Customs Bureau 1-4

== See also ==
- Customs law of Thailand
