= Customs law of Thailand =

Thai law affecting the transfer of goods

Customs Regulations in Thailand is a combination of requirements affecting on import and export of production across the border of Thailand. Thailand has a system of “green” and “red corridor”. “Green corridor” can be used by person transferring goods which are not subject to a customs declaration. “Red corridor” is provided for persons transferring goods which are subject to a customs declaration. For instance, goods that should be paid by customs taxes, forbidden goods or goods that required a special authorization.

== Import rules ==
=== Items aren’t subject to a customs declaration ===
Passport holders, whatever their age may transport across the border following duty-free items:

- 200 cigarettes or 250 g of tobacco per person (blocks must be in different bags).
- 1 L of alcohol (it doesn’t depend on alcohol proof).
- Items for personal use with value up to 80000 Baht.
- 1 camera or video camera.
- 5 photographic films or 3 cassettes for 8- or 16mm video camera.
- Household items and domestic appliances: owner may transport it within reasonable limits owing to relocation.

Travelers with transit visa and visa on arrival may freely import into the country items with a value up to 10 000 Baht per person or 20000 Baht per family.
Tourist visa owners may freely import into the country items with value up to 20 000 Baht per person or 40 000 Baht per family.
In the case of an attempt to import non-registered goods with a value above the prescribed limit, the offender will get a fine, four times higher than the value of the goods. Food should not be transported in hand baggage.

=== Items which require license ===
- Firearm and ammunition (for instance, fireworks and firecrackers) require a license issued by the Ministry of the Interior.
- Gold in bars or in plates. If there is no import license, gold may be left at customs. It will be returned on departure.
- Plants and parts of plants have required a license issued by the Ministry of Agriculture.
- Potent pharmaceutical drugs are required relevant documentation and import license.

=== Forbidden items ===
- Any pornographic materials or intimate items with the image of genitals.
- PNVs and hookah.
- Narcotic and psychotropic substances.
- Unlicensed video and audio materials (pirated copies).
- Powerbanks with capacities higher than 32 000 mAh (powerbanks with lower capacity must be transported only in hand baggage).
- Meat from any country, that was affected by BSE, mad cow disease or foot and mouth disease.
- Import of some threatened species of plants, animals or their parts is forbidden or limited in bounds of CITES.

=== Pets ===
- Pets must have a medical certificate in English, signed by an authorized veterinary official of the country-exporter government. The importer must connect with Animal Quarantine Station at the airport of entry at least 15 days before the importation. If the animal is transported as a cargo import license is also required. This license is issued by the Department of Livestock Development.
- Cats and dogs: a rabies-free certificate is required.
- Birds: the country of origin must be free of avian flu. The bird must be in the country of origin no less than 6 weeks from the time of hatching. Birds must be isolated or in quarantine under the supervision of a veterinary official for 2 days before the shipping.
- During at least 30 days after arriving all pets must be under quarantine in approved rooms at the expense of the importer/owner.
- Pets may be transported as a piece of checked baggage of passengers, in the cabin, or as cargo.

Pitbull terrier and American Staffordshire terrier are prohibited for import into Thailand.

=== Import of currency ===
There are allowed to enter the following sums by cash:

- The local currency (Baht/THB): up to 50 000 Baht per person or 100 000 Baht per family.
- Foreign currency: unlimited. But sums, that exceed in the equivalent of 20 000 US dollars, must be declared at customs.

== Export rules ==
=== Items aren’t subject to a customs declaration ===
- Free export of tobacco products in any quantity.

=== Items which require licensing ===
- There is a need to take the relevant certificate for export of jewelry, ingots and gems, which are bought in Thailand, in the shop.
- Works of art and antique. License can be obtained in the Department of Fine Arts.

=== Forbidden items ===
- Raw corals and raw or loose gemstones (allowed only as a souvenir or jewelry)
- Items of ivory and skin and bones of protected animals―big cats (tigers, leopards, snow leopards)
- The imagery of Buddha (except medallions and statues up to 13 cm) and Bodhisattva, and their fragments; alms bowls. An exception is made only for travelers, that travel on cultural exchange and export imagery of Buddha and Bodhisattva for research goals.
- Narcotic substances.
- Erotic or pornographic items.
- Whole durian (allowed sliced, dried or packed durian), coconuts and watermelons.
- Sand and soil (including soil from pots with plants).
- Stuffed animals and treated crocodile leather (allowed in the form of finished product).
- Alive turtles and items of tortoise shell.
- Seahorse (can be found on sale in the dried form).
- Gold in bars and platinum jewelry.
- Postage stamps.
- False royal seals, official stamps.
- Items with the image of the national flag of Thailand.

=== Pets ===
Export of pitbull terriers and American Staffordshire terriers is forbidden. For other animal export license is required.

=== Export of currency ===
There are allowed to export the following sums of cash:

- Local currency (Baht/THB): up to 50 000 Baht per person or 100 000 Baht per family. However, in the case of export Thai currency to countries such as Laos, Myanmar, Cambodia, Malaysia and Vietnam its amount may not exceed 500 000 Baht.
- Foreign currencies: unlimited. But sums, that exceed in the equivalent of 20 000 US dollars, must be declared at customs.

== VAT refund ==
A foreign national can use the VAT (Value Added Tax) refund at the rate of 7% for items that were bought in Thailand and cost of services. Refund is made on departure upon production of VAT refund forms which are supporting your right to refund.

=== Conditions for VAT refund ===
- The refund may be asserted only by a foreigner, that was in the Kingdom for less than 180 days per calendar year. Aircrew leaving Thailand for duty has no right to refund.
- Refund is applied only to items which are exported during 60 days after buying.
- Minimum amount should be no less than 2 000 Baht in each shop.
- Total value of items must be more than 5 000 Baht.
- Items must be bought in the stores with labeled: “VAT refund for tourists”.
- During the buying buyer’s passport must be presented to the seller in order to obtain a VAT refund form on PP10.
- All receipts and checks of credit card must be kept.
- VAT refund can be made only in international airports (Bangkok, Phuket, Chiangmai, etc.)

=== Items that should not be required for VAT refund ===
- Forbidden items.
- Firearm, explosive materials or any such item.
- Gems.

If the refund doesn’t exceed 10 000 Baht, it would be made by cash in Baths, check or money transfer to credit card. If the amount of the refund exceeds 10 000 Baht, then refund would be made by check or money transfer. If refund will be made by cash, 100 Baht commission will be charged. If it will be made by check, commission will be 100 Baht + commission for bank rate + duties on postage. If it will be made by money transfer, commission will be 100 Baht + commission for money transfer according to the bank’s tariffs. Complainant’s documentation should be checked and approved before registration. It happens in the VAT Department in the departure hall. Then refund is processed in the departure awaiting hall of the airport. That is why goods must be in hand luggage.
