= Combertault =

- Commune
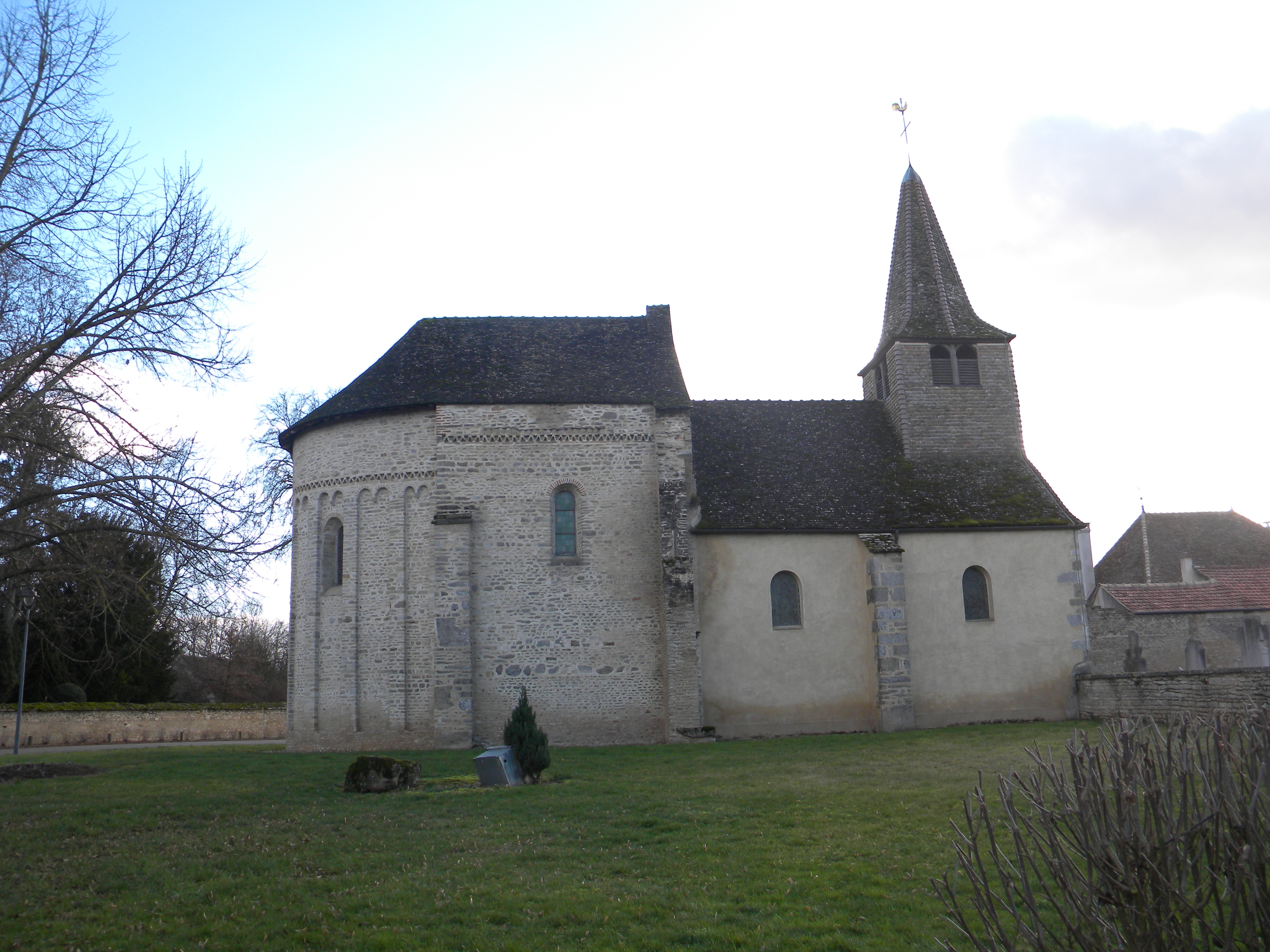
- The church in Combertault

- Coat of arms
- Location of Combertault
- Location within France Location within Bourgogne-Franche-Comté
- Coordinates: 46°59′37″N 4°53′59″E
- Country: France
- Region: Bourgogne-Franche-Comté
- Department: Côte-d'Or
- Arrondissement: Beaune
- Canton: Ladoix-Serrigny
- Intercommunality: CA Beaune Côte et Sud

Government
  - Mayor (2020–2026): Didier Saint-Ève
- Area^{1}: 3.92 km^{2} (1.51 sq mi)
- Highest elevation: 211 m (692 ft)
- Lowest elevation: 188 m (617 ft)
- Population (2023): 527
  - Density: 134/km^{2} (348/sq mi)
- Time zone: UTC+01:00 (CET)
  - Summer (DST): UTC+02:00 (CEST)
- INSEE/Postal code: 21185 /21200
- ^{1} French Land Register data, which excludes lakes, ponds, glaciers > 1 km^{2} (0.386 sq mi or 247 acres) and river estuaries.

Combertault (French pronunciation: [kɔ̃bɛʁto]) is a commune in the Côte-d'Or department in eastern France.

== Population ==
Historical population
Year	Pop.	±% p.a.
1968	118	—
1975	133	+1.72%
1982	185	+4.83%
1990	223	+2.36%
1999	275	+2.36%
2007	461	+6.67%
2012	549	+3.56%
2017	553	+0.15%
2023	527	−0.80%
Source: INSEE

== See also ==
- Communes of the Côte-d'Or department
