= Immaculate Conception Church, Bangkok =

Oldest Catholic Church in Thailand

Coordinates: 13.7770°N 100.5037°E

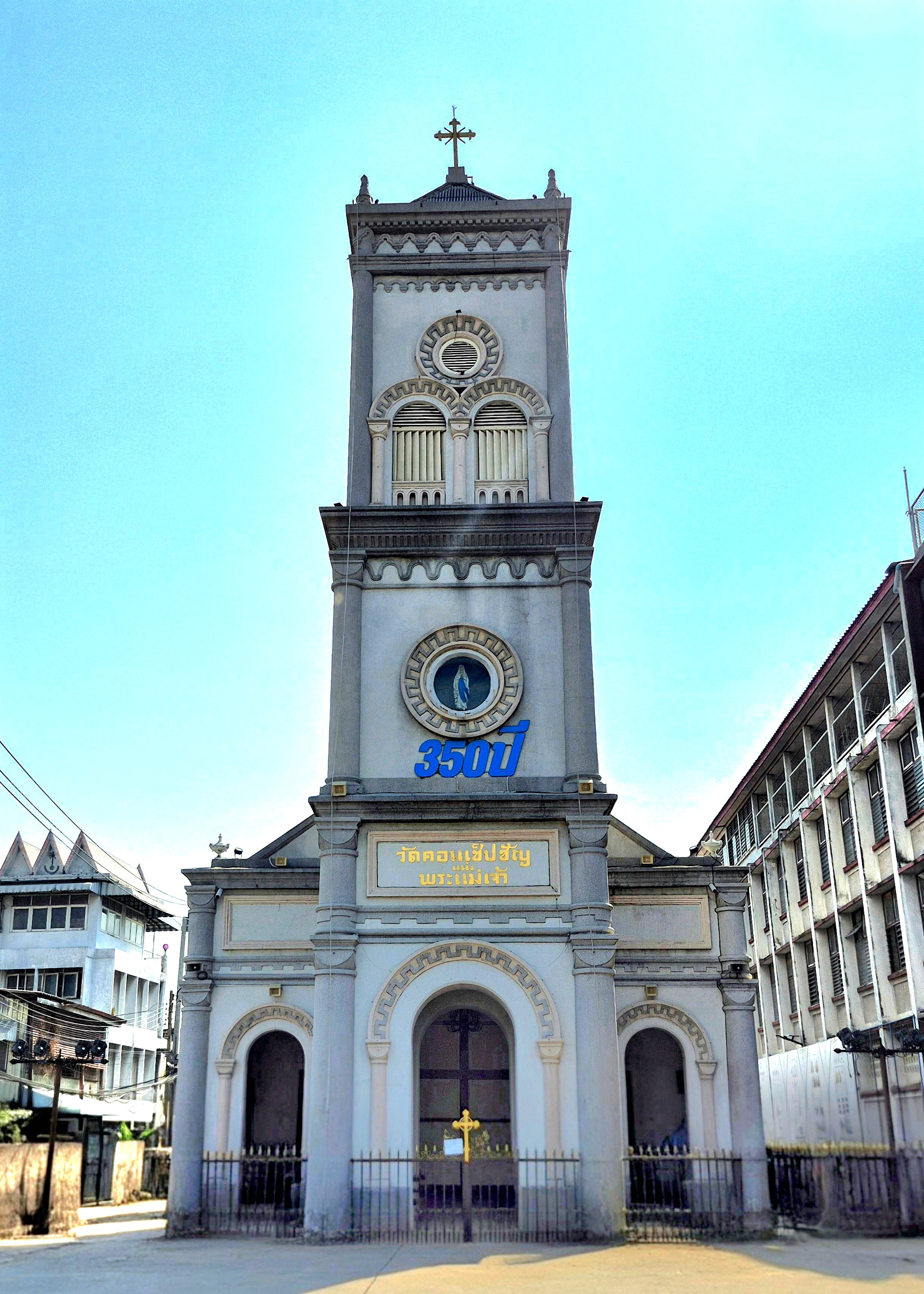
Immaculate Conception Church in 2026

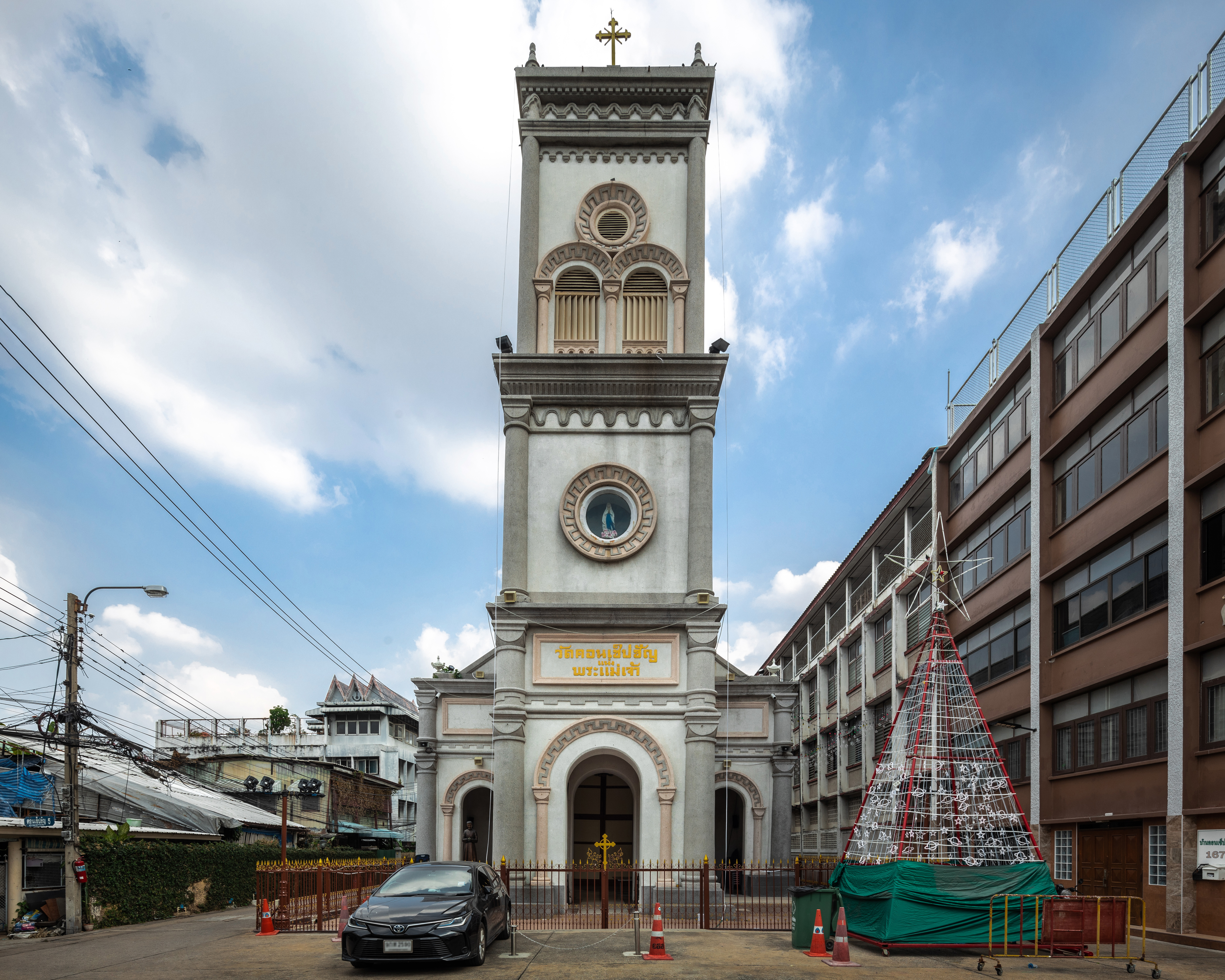
Immaculate Conception Church in 2023

The Church of Immaculate Conception of Bangkok (Thai: วัดคอนเซ็ปชัญแห่งพระแม่เจ้า, pronounced [wát kʰɔ̄(ː)n.sép.t͡ɕʰān, -t͡ɕʰân]), also known as Wat Khamen (วัดเขมร, [wát kʰā.měːn]), is the oldest Catholic church in Thailand. Its name Immaculate Conception comes from the Catholic belief that by the will of God the Virgin Mary was conceived free from original sin.

== History ==
The first Portuguese missionaries arrived in Thailand in 1567. Bangkok, at that time, was still a transit port along the Chao Phraya river on the way to Ayutthaya. In 1674, during the Ayutthaya era, King Narai the Great granted land in Bangkok to the Portuguese community to build the Church of Immaculate Conception. The French had attempted under several expeditions to Thailand to try to convert King Narai to Catholicism, despite his refusal, he allowed both French and Portuguese missionaries to continue their work in spreading their faith. During the building of the church the city of Ayutthaya was captured by the Burmese and this halted progression for a while however construction soon continued.

During the Bangkok era King Rama I invited the Portuguese traders to return in order to stimulate the economy and the church was rebuilt in 1785. The Church was rebuilt on two other occasions in 1832 and 1847 by an influential French missionary Monsignor Pallegoix. The building from 1847 remains today.

== The Church and refugees ==
The Church has a long history associated with refugees. In 1785 the Portuguese came with Cambodian refugees who had fled the civil war of their country. They were the main contributors in rebuilding the church. During this period 500 Cambodians took refuge in the church and it was later renamed Bot Ban Khamen or Cambodian Village Church.

Vietnamese immigration increased in Thailand due to religious persecution in Vietnam. In 1832 Thailand waged a war with Vietnam and many prisoners of war taken to Thailand refused to return to Vietnam and preferred to stay in Bangkok. They rebuilt the Church in 1832 and it was called Bot Ban Yuan or Vietnamese Village Church.

== Location ==
Soi Mitrakham, Samsen, Bangkok, Thailand.

== Sources ==
- http://www.tour-bangkok-legacies.com/immaculate-conception-church.html
- https://web.archive.org/web/20030227151139/http://www.mfa.go.th/web/112.php
- https://web.archive.org/web/20090621210217/http://www.mfa.go.th/web/117.php
