= Phaptawan Suwannakudt =

Thai mural painter

Phaptawan Suwannakudt (Thai: ภาพตะวัน สุวรรณกูฏ, born 1959) is a Thai artist based in Sydney and Bangkok.

Suwannakudt primarily works with traditional Thai mural painting, and has been involved in numerous public projects and a series of individual artworks. Her works are exhibited widely in Paris, Bangkok, Tokyo, Melbourne, Manila, including Sydney Biennale, Bangkok Art biennale, Jakarta biennale, and documenta 15. She was one of the co-founding artists of Womanifesto, an international art exchange program focusing on women artists, established in Thailand in 1995.

In her work, Suwannakudt explores art as a means to connect and communicate with individuals through the process of storytelling that transcends boundaries of language, identity, and temporality.

== Early life and education ==
Suwannakudt was born in 1959 in Thailand. She graduated from Suksanaree High School in Bangkok in 1977, and obtained a B.A. degree majoring in English and minoring in German in Silpakorn University in 1980. In 2006, she earned a Master of Visual Arts from the Sydney College of the Arts, University of Sydney.

Her father, Paiboon Suwannakudt, or Tan Kudt, was also an artist who worked in Thai style. When she was a child, they would travel around Thailand to visit Buddhist temples. Informed by her upbringing in a Theravada Buddhist society, which sees women as lesser in material and spiritual value compared to men, Suwannakudt's practice offers a personal mediation of the everyday experiences and emotions of women under a patriarchal culture.

== Career ==
For 12 years from 1970 to 1981, Suwannakudt was a painting apprentice to her father Paiboon Suwannakudt, who taught her how to illustrate Buddhist narratives, as well as encouraged her artistic ambitions and literary pursuits. Graduated with an English degree, she became an E.S.L. teacher for Indo-Chinese refugees at Pragmatics Company Ltd., a UNHCR Project, in 1981.

In 1982, Suwannakudt began to pursue a career as a painter after her father's death at age 57, when she was asked to complete his unfinished Grand Staircase mural at the Anantara Siam Bangkok Hotel. From 1984 to 1986, she continued to organise and lead the Tan Kudt Group of painters in making temple and hotel murals, most notably the murals at the Bangkok Peninsula Hotel (now Four Seasons Hotel). She became one of the first women to paint temple murals in Thailand, thus inverting gender and age-based hierarchies within traditional mural practice.

After migrating to Australia in 1996, Suwannakudt continued to challenge her practice as a mural painter, as well as explore her own cultural and ethnic identity in a new environment. She was also an artist in residence in Bundanon Trust, residential Studio Grant in January in 2003, as well as in The Womanifesto International Collaborative Programme at Rai Boonbandarn, North East Thailand in 2008.

== Selected exhibitions and works ==
=== Solo exhibitions ===
- Re al-re-g(l)ory, Art Gallery of New South Wales (2021)
- One Whole Apart, Art Atrium, Sydney (2017)
- Reincarnation of the Butterflies, Air Space Sydney (2016)
- Retold-Untold Stories, SCA Galleries, Sydney College of the Arts, Sydney (2016)
- Retold-Untold Stories, Chiang Mai University Art Centre (2014)
- Crossing Boundaries, Sydney Town Hall (2014)
- Bhava: state of being, Arc One Gallery, Melbourne (2014)
- ORIENTing: With or Without You, Lawrence Wilson Art Gallery, UWA Western Australia (2013)
- Catching the Moment: Each Step is the Past, 4A Centre for Contemporary Asia Art, Sydney (2010)
- Three Worlds, Arc One Gallery, Melbourne (2009)
- The Journey of an Elephant: The Ongoing Journey, Arc One Gallery, Melbourne (2007)
- The Elephant and the Bush, Arc one Gallery, Melbourne (2004)
- Recent Works, Numthong Gallery, Bangkok (2004)
- Turtles, a fish, and Ghosts..., Gallery 4A, Sydney (2002)
- Buddhist Lives, Tadu Gallery, Bangkok (2000)
- New Works, Sherman Galleries, Hargrave Street, Sydney (1999)

=== Group exhibitions ===
- Leave ~~it~~ and Break ~~no~~ Hearts, with Samak Kosem, 100 Tonson Foundation, Bangkok (2022)
- UN/THAID, Grau Projekt, Melbourne (2019)
- Between Suns, Cement Fondu, Sydney, curated by Megan Monte (2018)
- Study for Knowledge in your Hands, Eyes and Mind, Cement Fondu, Sydney (2018)
- Traces of Words, Museum of Anthropology, University of British Columbia, Vancouver (2017)
- Beauty and Myth of Southeast Asia, Thienny Lee Gallery, Sydney (2016)
- Thresholds: Contemporary Thai Art, Sundaram Tagore Gallery, New York (2013)
- Women Artists Exhibition, 100th year of International Women's Day, National Gallery of Thailand (2011)
- Edge of Elsewhere, as part of Sydney Festival 2011, Campbelltown Arts Centre, NSW (2010)
- Redlands Westpac Art Prize, Mosman Gallery, Sydney (2010)

=== Temple murals and other Buddhist works ===
- A Buddhist Series of Tree and Flower Allegories (1999)
- An alter painting of the Buddha in meditation commissioned by the Zen Centre, Annandale for its Gorricks' Run meditation temple (1998/99)
- Lives of the Buddha in Sydney executed and completed in Sydney (1997/98)

=== Biennales ===
- Sleeping Deep Beauty, Jakarta Biennale (2021)
- Knowledge in your hands, eyes, and minds, Beyond Bliss: Inaugural Bangkok Art Biennale, Bangkok (2018–2019)
- Not for Sure, 18th Sydney Biennale (2012)
