= Surawong Road =

Street in Bangkok, Thailand

Coordinates: 13°43′31.50″N 100°30′58.48″E

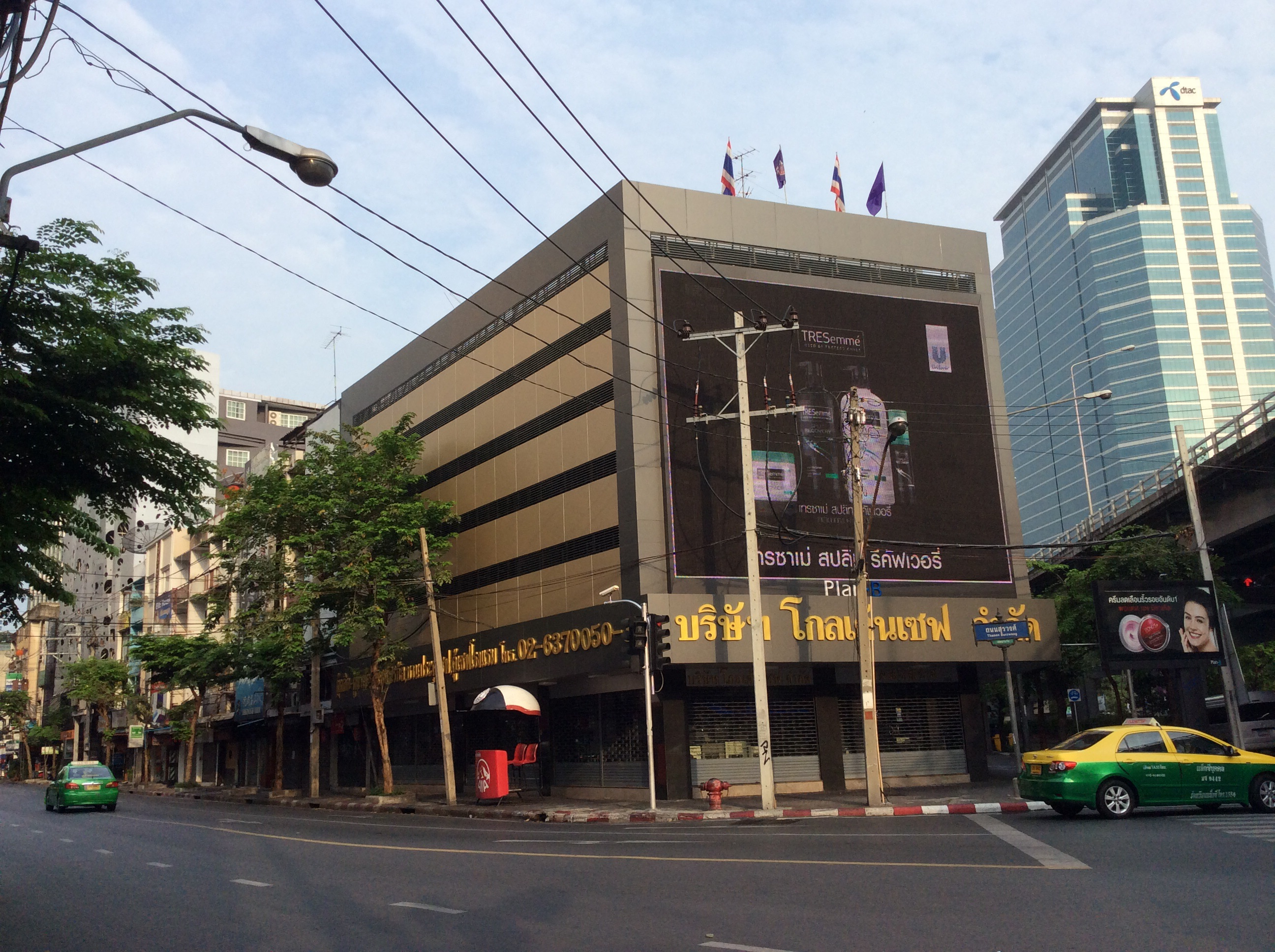
The east end of Surawong Road, at Henri Dunant Intersection

Surawong Road (Thai: ถนนสุรวงศ์, pronounced [sù.ra.wōŋ]) is a road in the Bang Rak District of Bangkok, Thailand, linking Charoen Krung Road to Rama IV and forming the boundary between Suriyawong and Si Lom subdistricts. It was built at the end of the 19th century during Bangkok's period of expansion following the country's opening up to the West, and was home to many leading businesses, upper-class families, and members of the expatriate community. It was known as a Western-style nightlife entertainment district during the 1920s, and was—and still is—home to many leading hotels. The road grew as a business district along with the nearby Si Lom Road during the mid-20th century, but lagged behind in development toward the end of the century due to its limited traffic capacity. Today, it is still home to several historic landmarks, as well as many well-known restaurants.

== History ==
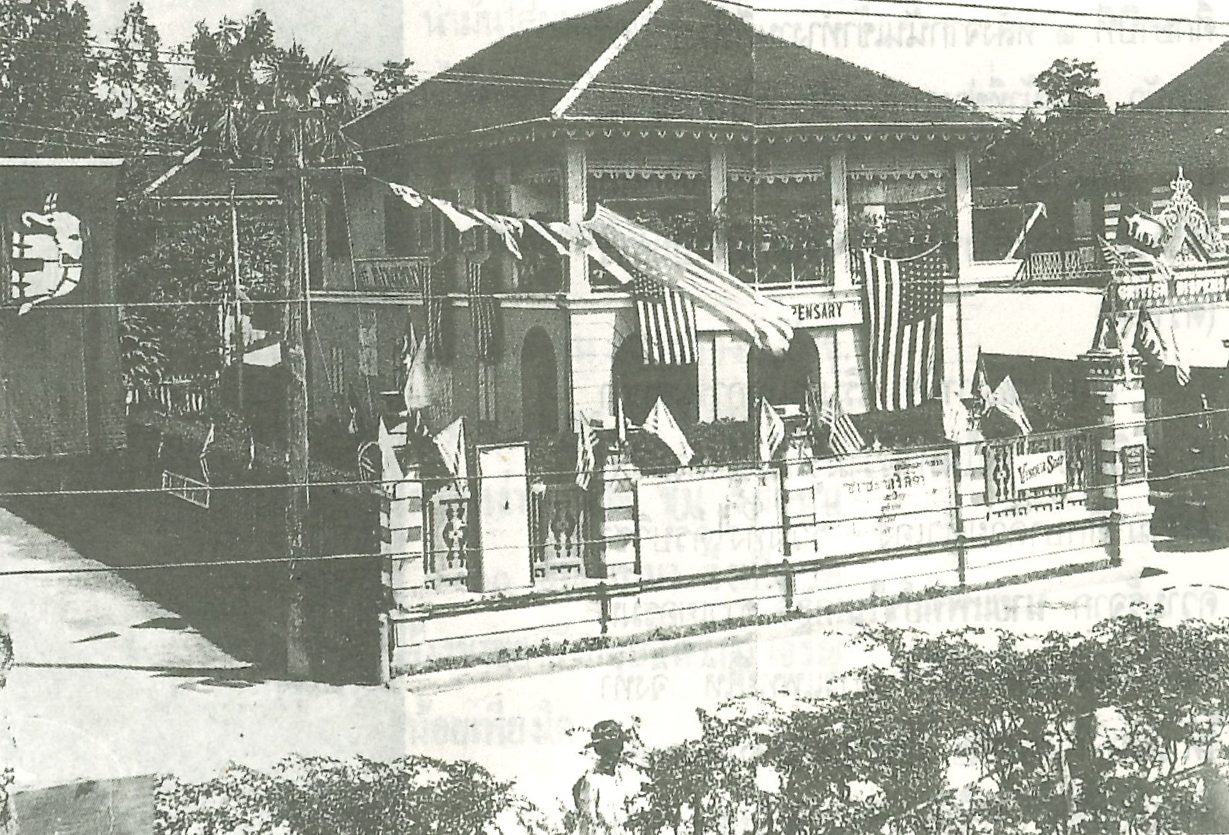
The British Dispensary occupied the corner of Charoen Krung and Surawong roads.

At the end of the 19th century, the area beyond Bangkok's old city boundary marked by Phadung Krung Kasem Canal was seeing rapid growth, with increasing numbers of Western expatriates and upper-class families settling in the area that is now Bang Rak District, which had been opened up through the construction of new roads, including Charoen Krung, Trong (now Rama IV) and Si Lom. Around 1890, the enterprising businessmen Luang Sathonrachayut bought up tracts of property and had Sathon Road built to link Charoen Krung and Trong roads, making large profits through the development. Another nobleman, Phraya Siharatdechochai (To Bunnag, later to become Chaophraya Surawong Watthanasak), likewise built a road parallel to Si Lom and Sathon, running from Charoen Krung to Trong Road, as well as a perpendicular road connecting it with Si Lom. Construction of the roads, both with canal-crossing bridges, was completed in 1897, and his wife Thanphuying Talap dedicated the road in an audience with Queen Saovabha Phongsri, who was ruling as regent during King Chulalongkorn's visit to Europe. (To was also accompanying the King on the trip.) The Queen named the road Surawong and the connecting road Decho, and the act was announced in the Royal Gazette on 12 June.

According to recollections of the cultural scholar Sathirakoses, at the road's completion, its Charoen Krung end was lined with spacious two-storey Western-style houses, three on each side of the road. American doctor T. Heyward Hays ran the British Dispensary from the house in the southeast corner. Other residents of the neighbourhood included expatriate doctors Alphonse Poix (a French surgeon who became royal physician to the king), John Carrington (a Presbyterian missionary) and Malcolm Arthur Smith (who also served as royal physician), as well as German trumpet teacher Jacob Feit (father of the composer Peter Feit) and an Italian lady called Madame Staro, who ran a restaurant and bar called the Trocadero. (Note: Staro would later become the proprietor of the Hotel Royal on Sathon Road.) Other establishments on the street included the French pharmacy, the store of Harry A. Badman & Co., the British Club, Neilson Hays Library, and the German club (Deutscher Klub). Towards its eastern end, the road remained mostly empty early on, and except for a few villas mostly belonging to members of the Bunnag family, vegetable gardens and empty fields occupied the landscape for the next few decades.

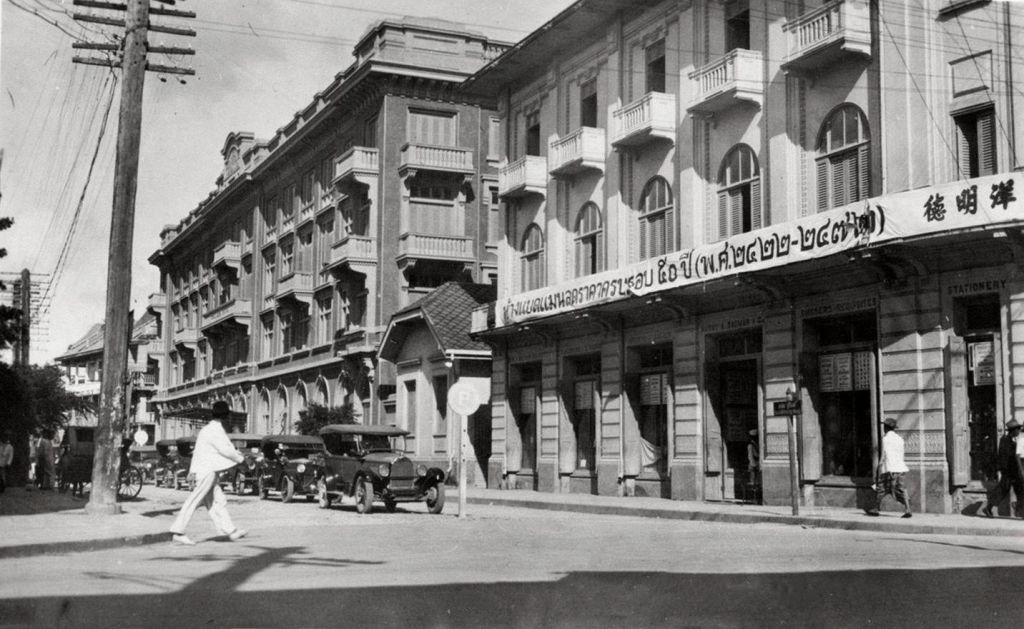
The Trocadero Hotel (centre-left) and Harry A. Badman & Co. (right), in 1929

In the 1920s, developments along the road's western end introduced new Western-style restaurants and entertainment venues, and the road became famous for its nightlife scene. Dance halls and beer halls featured names such as Rose Hall, the Wembley, Moulin Rouge and Luna Hall. Madame Staro's bungalow was re-established as the Trocadero Hotel in 1927; the four-storey building soon became known as one of the leading luxury hotels in the city.

Around the mid-20th century, development along Surawong Road grew, following the expansion of nearby Si Lom, and many businesses established their offices here. However, commercial activity declined towards the end of the century due to the road's limited traffic capacity. (In addition to being narrower, Surawong is not served by bus lines or rapid transit.) While some office blocks dot the street and many business continue to operate, others have since relocated, and the Surawong neighbourhood remains much lower-key than the bustling business district of Si Lom and Sathon, though its proximity to the nightlife scenes of Si Lom makes it popular among tourists. By the 2000s and 2010s, commercial development along Surawong had mostly stagnated, and many venues closed down as many owners gradually sold off property to investors. Charoen Sirivadhanabhakdi's TCC Group, in particular, has reportedly (as of 2017) been actively buying up old shophouses in the area.

== Name ==
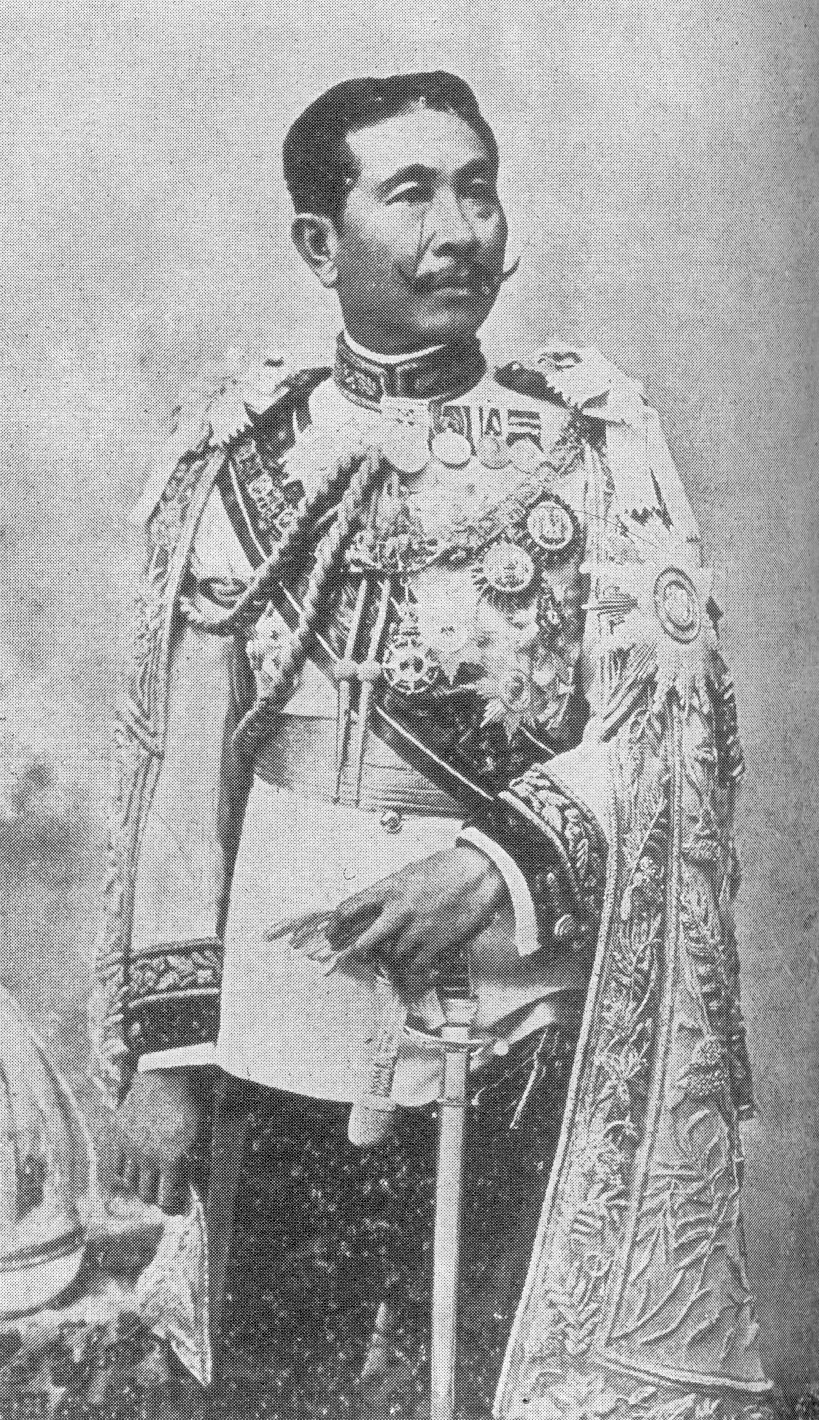
Construction of the road was commissioned by Chaophraya Surawong Watthanasak

There has been some uncertainty surrounding the name of the road. While the 1897 royal proclamation names the road as Surawong (สุรวงษ), in actual usage it appears to have been referred to as Suriwongse (สุริวงศ์, pronounced [sù.rí.wōŋ]). This prompted a debate among the council of ministers in 1930, during the reign of King Prajadhipok (Rama VII). While considering a plan to extend the road's western end to the riverside (which ultimately was not done), Prince Naris noted that the name made no semantic sense. It was decided to rename the road Surawong (สุรวงศ์), reflecting the title of its builder. However, a few days later Prince Paribatra wrote a memo recalling that Chaophraya Surawong did not have that title at the time of the road's construction, and it was more likely named after the title of his grandfather Somdet Chaophraya Sri Suriwongse, which had sometimes been used as a family name (i.e. as the Surivongs family). Prajadhipok accordingly ruled to reinstate the road's name as Suriwongse, though with the spelling changed to สุริยวงศ์ to match the title. By the late 20th century, the road's name had shifted to Surawong (สุรวงศ์), though the subdistrict that borders it to the north is indeed known by the same spelling as in Prajadhipok's ruling (สุริยวงศ์). However, it is pronounced as [sù.rí.já.wōŋ] and romanized as Suriyawong, following modern standards.

== Places ==
Surawong Road runs 2 kilometres (1.2 mi) between Henri Dunant Intersection at its northeast end, where it is crossed by Rama IV Road and continues north as Henri Dunant Road, and Surawong Junction at the southwest end, where it meets Charoen Krung Road near Soi Charoen Krung 36. It is connected to the parallel Si Phraya Road to its north via Sap, Naret and Maha Set roads, and to Si Lom Road to its south via Decho, Naradhiwas Rajanagarindra and Mahesak, as well as several side-streets (soi). These include the alleys of Thaniya and Patpong, neighbourhoods between Surawong and Si Lom known for their nightlife scenes and red-light districts. Soi Pratuchai, between Surawong and Rama IV, is also known as such.

Surawong Road is home to several large hotels, including the well-known Montien, and also many restaurants. A few historic landmarks continue to line the road, including the Neilson Hays Library, the British Club and Suriyasai House, a former villa of the Bunnag family which now houses a restaurant.

=== British Dispensary ===
The British Dispensary used to occupy premises on the corner of Surawong Junction, in what was then the commercial centre of Bang Rak. Operated by T. Heyward Hays, it was one of several Western pharmacies that opened toward the end of the 19th century.

=== Deutscher Klub ===
The German Club, or Deutscher Klub, was founded around 1890, and moved into permanent premises on the south side of Surawong Road in 1896. It was equipped with tennis courts, a gymnasium, billiard tables and a bowling alley, the last of was a well-known source of intrigue among local Thais.

=== British Club ===
The British Club was founded in 1903, first occupying premises on the north side of the road, before moving to its current location, on the south side near the junction with Naret Road, in 1910. It is listed as an unregistered ancient monument and received the ASA Architectural Conservation Award in 2006.

=== Suriyasai House ===
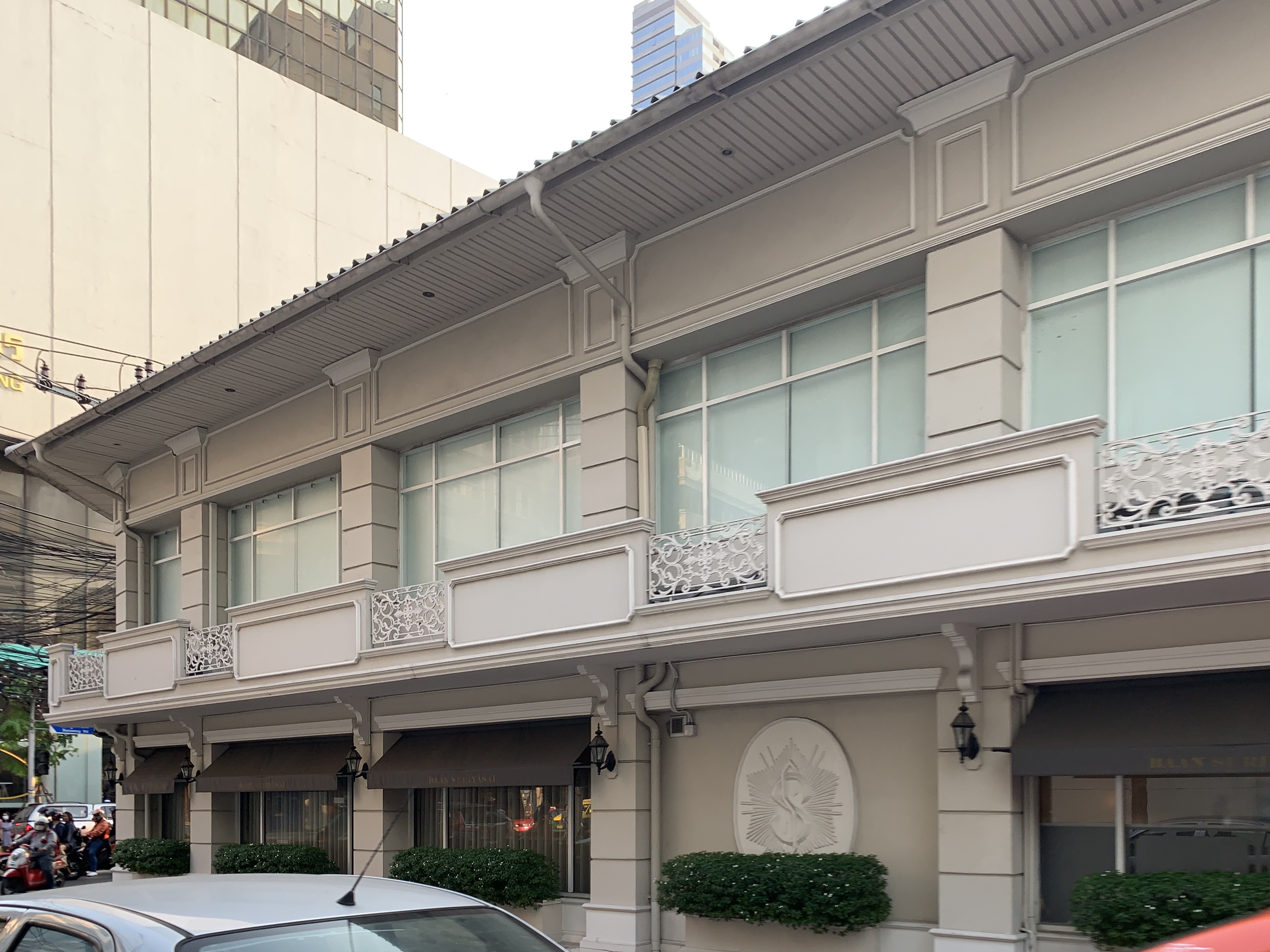
Suriyasai House

Suriyasai House was built in the 1900s by Phra Adisak Aphirat (Tem Suriwong Bunnag), a son of Chaophraya Surawong Watthanasak, on the corner of Surawong and Sap roads. It was restored in 2003, and received the ASA Architectural Conservation Award in 2004. Today, it houses the restaurant Baan Suriyasai.

=== Neilson Hays Library ===
Neilson Hays Library was commissioned by T. Heyward Hays, former proprietor of the British Dispensary, and opened in 1922. It was named in memory of his wife, Jennie Neilson Hays. The library continues to operate today. The building, a registered ancient monument, received the ASA Architectural Conservation Award in 1982.

=== Harry A. Badman & Co. ===
Harry A. Badman & Co. operated one of the largest department stores in the city. The business was founded in 1879, and was previously located near the Grand Palace. The store relocated to new premises on Surawong, next to the Trocadero Hotel, probably in the 1920s.

=== Trocadero Hotel ===
The Trocadero Hotel opened in 1927, and was operated by Chavee Bunnag. The 45-room hotel, named after the Palais du Trocadéro in Paris, was the first to feature an elevator and air conditioning, and was known as one of the top luxury hotels in the city. It was also particularly known for its restaurant and dance hall.

The hotel building stood into the 21st century, though it had much deteriorated by then. It was converted to a budget hotel, named the New Trocadero, which has been described as a shadow of its former self. The building was demolished in 2018.

=== Montien Hotel ===
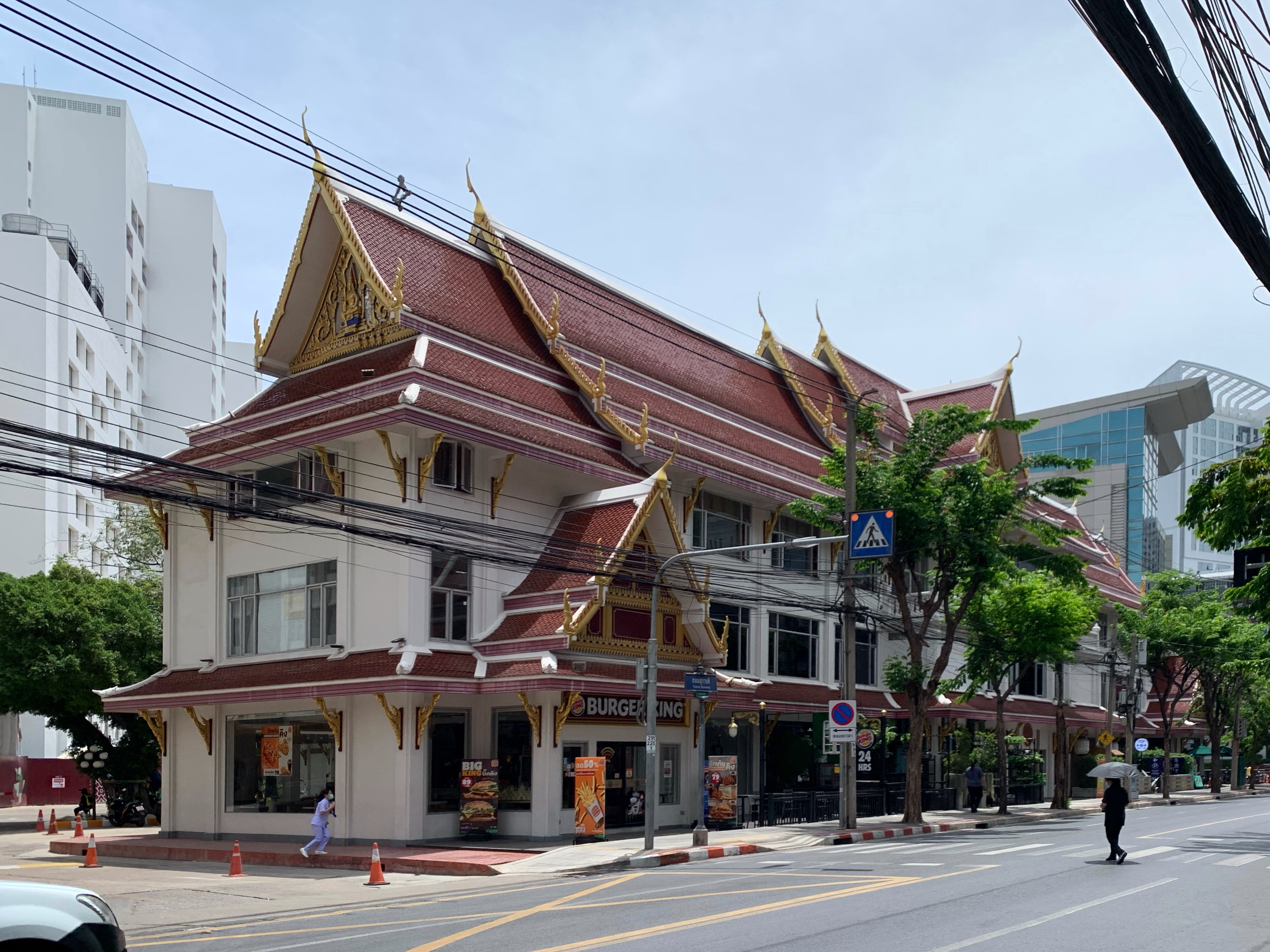
The Thai Lai Thong building at the Montien Hotel is designed in traditional Thai style, resembling a Buddhist temple.

The Montien Hotel opened in 1967, and is well known for its modernist design by national artist Mitrarun Kasemsri as well as the interior decorations featuring art by famed traditional artisan Paiboon Suwannakudt.
