= Suriyawong =

Suriyawong may refer to:

- Suriyawong Subdistrict in Bangkok
- Somdet Chaophraya Sri Suriwongse, also written as Si Suriyawong, a Thai noble
- Suriyawong (Ender's Game), a character in the Ender's Game series

== See also ==
- Surawong Road
