= British Dispensary =

Thai pharmaceutical and cosmetics group of companies

British Dispensary Group is a Thai pharmaceutical and cosmetics group of companies, best known for its Snake Brand line of products. It was established as the British Dispensary in 1892 by Western doctors Peter Gowan and Thomas Heyward Hays, and was later acquired by Luan Vongvanij in 1928. The business has since grown under the ownership of the Vongvanij family, and the group now consists of the following companies: The British Dispensary Co., Ltd.; The British Dispensary (L.P.) Co., Ltd.; British Dispensary Consumer Public Co., Ltd.; British Dispensary Health Care Co., Ltd. and The British Dispensary (L.P.) Sai 5 Co., Ltd.

== History ==
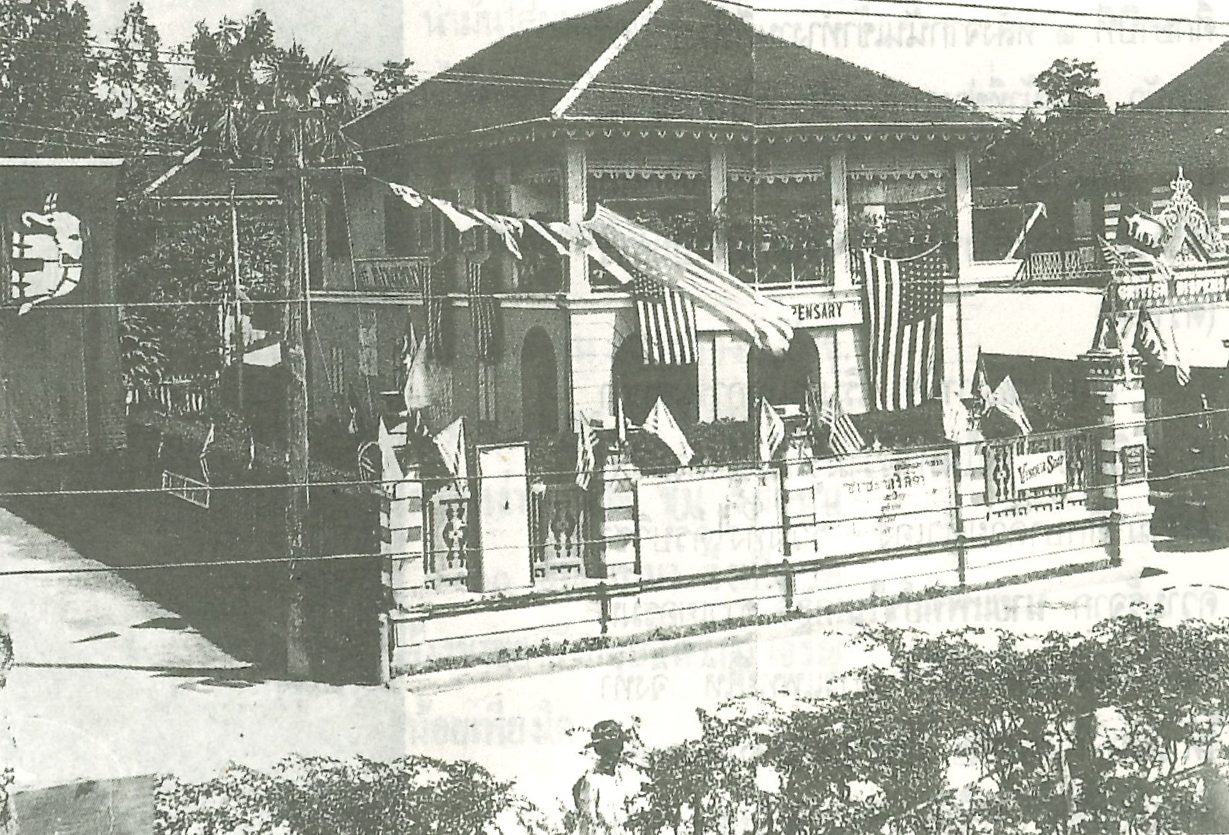
The original store on the corner of Charoen Krung and Surawong roads

The British Dispensary was founded in 1892 by Scottish doctor Peter Gowan and American doctor Thomas Heyward Hays, both of whom had been in the service of the government of King Chulalongkorn (Rama V). The business was one among several modern pharmacies that emerged in the country toward the end of the nineteenth century, and was a well known establishment on the corner of Charoen Krung Road and Surawong, in what was Bangkok's European district. After a few years Gowan passed the business onto Hays, and a second branch was opened in 1897 at Si Kak Phraya Si in what was then the inner city. Hays operated the business until 1906, when he transferred his interests to J. J. McBeth, who had joined the firm in 1898. In 1928, McBeth retired to his home country, and sold the business to Luan Vongvanij, a Chinese immigrant who had previously been an apprentice at the store. Since then, the business has been largely owned by the family, with Luan handing control to his sons Boonchit and Boonyong in 1963, and Boonyong to his son Anurut in 1993.

== Products ==
The group produces personal care products as well as medications and supplements. It is best known for its Snake Brand Prickly Heat cooling powder, so-named after the company's trademark, which had long been known by Thais as tra ngu (ตรางู 'snake brand'). It also produces other personal care products under the Snake Brand, as well as St Luke's baby powder and Quina skin tonic. Its annual revenue was about 1.2 billion baht in 2009.
