= Thaniya Road =

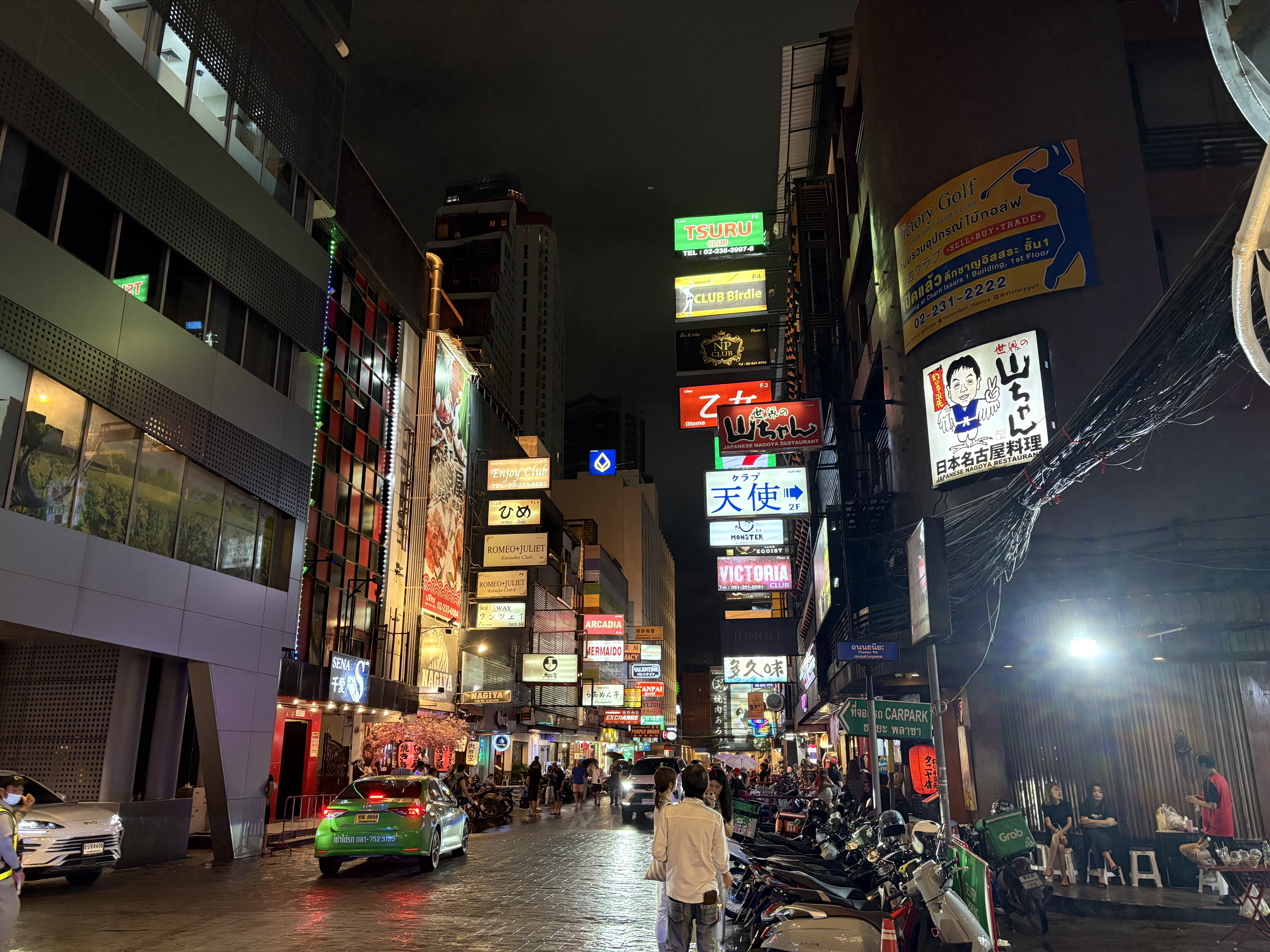
Thaniya Road in September 2025

Thaniya Road is a road connecting Silom Road and Surawong Road, located in Suriyawong Subdistrict, Bang Rak district, Bangkok, Thailand. Next to Silom Road is Sala Daeng Station. The road is approximately 230 meters long. During the day, it is an office area, and at night, it is an entertainment area with many bars including karaoke bars.

== History ==
Thaniya Road is named after the Thaniya Building, one of the first buildings on Silom Road. It was started as a joint venture between the Thaniya Group of the Sombuntham family and Sumitomo Real Estate from Japan, before the Thaniya Group later bought all the shares from Japan. The first Thaniya Building opened in 1970 under the name Thaniya, which was the name of the family's eldest brother, and Thaniya Road was also built to accommodate the development. The building is the office of Sumitomo and the remaining space is leased out.

The current building is called Thaniya Plaza, completed in 1989 and is the largest golf center in Thailand and Southeast Asia. There is a Japanese restaurant to cater to Japanese businessmen who rent offices in the area.

Originally, Thaniya Road had a noodle shop and a driving school, Jarat Choengchalat. The location of Thaniya Plaza was called the Japanese Embassy Subdistrict. It is a well-known area among Japanese people, including shops selling various types of products, such as shops selling hard-to-find film camera equipment and wine shops.

Thaniya Road is said to be the birthplace of karaoke in Thailand. Karaoke began in Thailand around the 1980s, initially offered through bars catering to Japanese business and tourist groups. Many of the Japanese owners of Thaniya clubs brought karaoke music to their customers because musicians at the time often encountered problems, such as absenteeism and failure to show up at agreed times. Furthermore, they also had to pay high wages. The owners of the clubs solved the problem by using karaoke music instead of hiring bands, as is the case in almost every Japanese club. Initially, the service was limited to Japanese customers, but it was later changed to include Thai customers to ensure business survival.

Thaniya is also home to a variety of hostess clubs catering to Japanese customers but also accepting all other nationalities.
