= Varsha Nair =

Indian artist (born 1957)

- Born: 1957 (age 68–69); Kampala, Uganda
- Education: Maharaja Sayajirao University of Baroda
- Known for: Painting, performance art, feminist art, live art
- Notable work: Encounter(s) (2006), Undercurrent Yangon (2014)
- Style: Contemporary art, performance art
- Movement: Feminist art, Womanifesto

Varsha Nair (born 1957) is a Ugandan Indian painter. Her work explores the concepts of displacement, home and belonging. Nair lives in Vadodara, India.

== Biography ==
Nair was born in Kampala, Uganda. She was trained in Maharaja Sayajirao University of Baroda and moved to Bangkok in 1995 after relocating from India to England and back.

She is one of the co-founders of Womanifesto, a feminist art collective and biennial program that was active in Thailand between 1997 and 2008, creating an international artist-led exchange platform in the country.

Her work has been exhibited in numerous art institutions, including Tate Modern (London), Haus der Kulturen der Welt (Berlin), Fondazione Sandretto Re Rebaudengo (Turin), Art in General (New York), Sarajevo Centre of Contemporary Art (Sarajevo), Experimenta Media Arts (Melbourne), LaSalle-SIA College of the Arts, Devi Art Foundation (New Delhi), and The Guild Art Gallery (Mumbai). She has published her articles in several art publications, including n.paradoxa, Southeast of Now: Directions in Contemporary and Modern Art in Asia, ArtAsiaPacific, and Ctrl+P Journal of Contemporary Art.

== Artworks ==
In 2006, Nair staged a series of live interventions titled Encounter(s), performed at the Turbine Hall in Tate Modern. She collaborated with Tejal Shah (from Mumbai) to develop these interventions, in which the artists wore white, embroidered straitjackets, connected to each other by absurdly long sleeves, and lay claim to the vast architectural Turbine Hall. This work was also performed in numerous other locations, including the National Review of Live Art festival in Glasgow and the Palazzo Carignano in Turin, Italy.

Her work, Undercurrent Yangon from 2014, was performed at the People's Park in Yangon, Myanmar. Vasha Nair also participated in the 2nd Beyond Pressure International Festival of Performance Art in Yangon in 2009.
