= Soi Pratuchai =

Street in Bangkok, Thailand

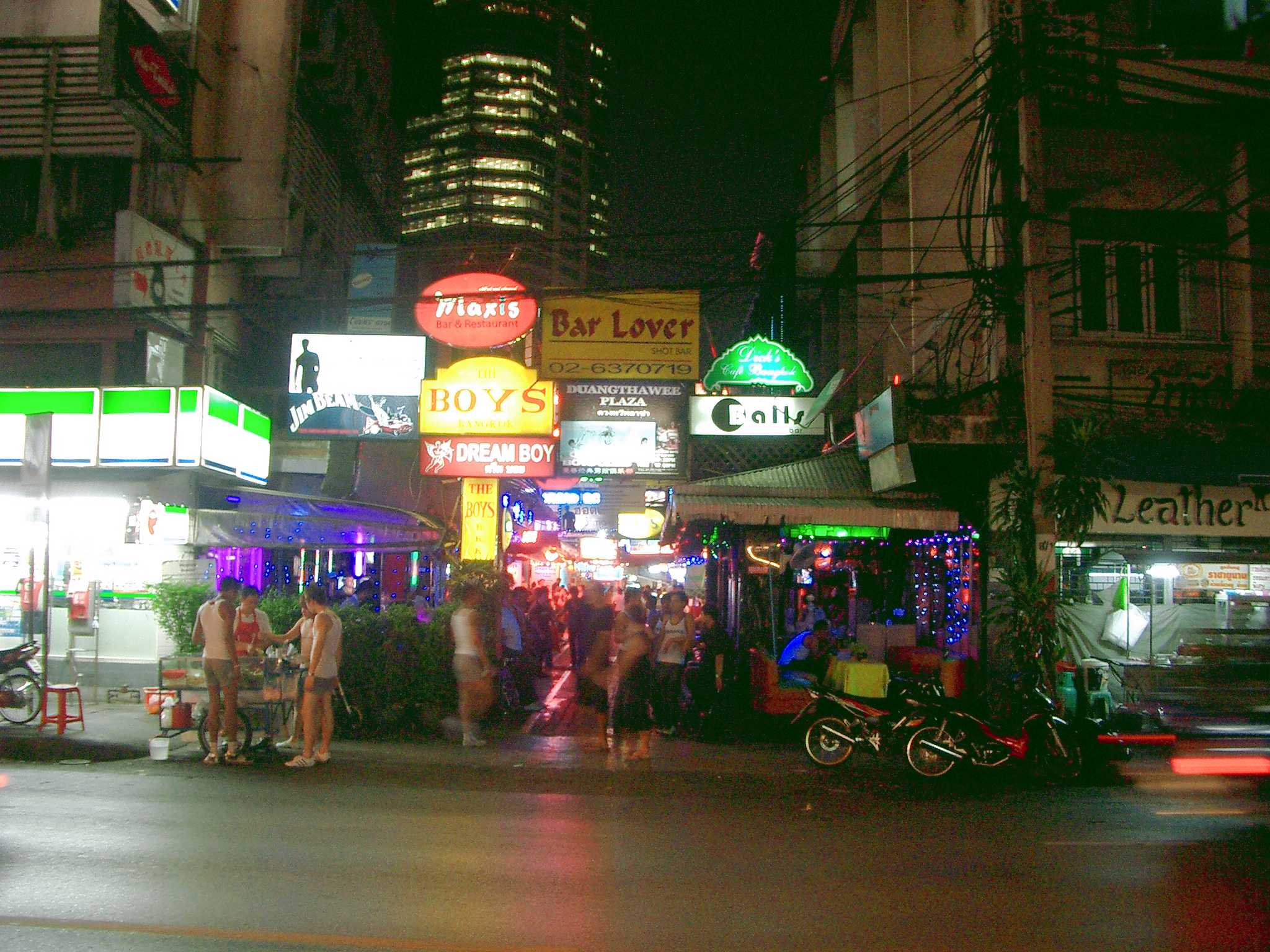
- Entrance to Soi Pratuchai, 2010
- Interactive map of Soi Pratuchai
- Addresses: Bangrak
- Location: Bangkok, Thailand
- Coordinates: 13.730443°N 100.5318478°E
- South end: Surawong Road
- North end: Rama IV Road

Other
- Known for: Gay entertainment area

Soi Pratuchai (alias: "Soi Twilight"; Thai: ซอยประตูชัย, meaning "Triumphal arch soi") was walkway ("soi") in the Bangrak district of Bangkok, Thailand known for being a gay-related entertainment district, catering mainly, though not exclusively, to foreign tourists and expatriates. While Soi Pratuchai was internationally known as a red light district for gays at the heart of Bangkok's sex industry, the city in fact has numerous gay-related red-light districts that are far more popular with Thai.

Soi Pratuchai was closed since 1 April 2019 with its land plots being bought. Some bars has relocated in the vicinity of Patpong, while others have closed down permanently. The site of Soi Pratuchai has since been occupied by Chula Culture, a 32-storied condominium developed by Ananda Development set to complete in 2025.

== Location and layout ==
Soi Pratuchai consisted of a "7"-shaped walkway running between Surawong Road and Rama IV Road. Soi Pratuchai is within walking distance from the BTS Skytrain Silom Line's Sala Daeng Station, and MRT Blue Line's Si Lom Station. It was a dead-ended alleyway and thus less car traffic in comparison to other gay districts in broader Patpong.

Establishments in Soi Pratuchai were mostly gay bars, restaurants, cafés and salons. Among them were: Hot Male Bar, Banana Bar, X-Boys Bar, Maxis Restaurant, Dream Boy Bar, Fresh Beach Boyz Bar, X size Bar, and Classic Boys Club where synchronized swimming shows were available

== History ==
Former site of Soi Pratuchai as of 2022, occupied by the construction site of Culture Chula

According to Oat Montien, a former artist-in-residence at Patpong Museum where history of sex tourism around Patpong area is studied, Soi Pratuchai began its name as a gay destination from a gay go-go bar named Twilight; later the soi's alias, that relocated from Sukhumwit area to the entrance of Soi Pratuchai in 1971. The bar was first mentioned in 1966 as a "gay" establishment - being one of the first instances of the term gay being referred to distinguishably from trans woman term kathoey. The bar was said to initially have no seat, all patrons must stand to be Twilight shake-hand-ed (referring to having their genitals being handheld) by the bar's hosts. As of 1990s, 20 years since Twilight moved to Soi Pratuchai, the entirety of establishments in the alleyway became gay bars. As of 2019, there were more than 10 gay bars.

In 2019, every land plots in the alleyway were sold. The reason behind the purchasing at the time was unknown. Soi Pratuchai's legacy of gay tourism suddenly came to an end, worsened by the COVID-19 pandemic in Thailand. The broader Patpong area, during the pandemic's peak, only three gay bars remained. It was officially closed on 1 April 2019 as its land plots were bought. Some bars has relocated in the vicinity of Patpong, while others have closed down permanently. The site of Soi Pratuchai has since been occupied by Chula Culture, a 32-storied condominium developed by Ananda Development set to complete in 2025.

== Sex-related businesses ==
Most Soi Pratuchai go-go bars feature boys dancing on a stage. The dancers (and even occasionally the serving staff) are generally available to customers willing to pay a bar fine to take them out of the bar; the fees for sexual services are negotiated separately. Some establishments advertising "massages" are in fact disguised brothels, and a few famous "blowjob bars" offer oral sex at the main bar or in back rooms.

Several upstairs bars still feature (technically illegal) sex shows, with boys performing various creative acts. Perhaps the most notorious of these features boys performing exotic feats involving bathing. Some of these second-floor gay bars are run by scam artists who lure tourists with offers of low prices and later present a wildly inflated bill along with a threat of physical harm should the bill go unpaid. The Tourist Police, usually stationed at Patpong 1 and Silom Road, can help in these situations.

Some establishments in Patpong employ kathoeys (or "ladyboys") either exclusively or as part of a mixed gender staff.

The bars open at 6 pm and close at 2 am.

== See also ==
- Prostitution in Thailand
- LGBTQ in Thailand

== Bibliography ==
- Ngo, Rosemary (1994). Go-go Bars Galore: Tourist and Expatriate-oriented Commercial Sex in Bangkok, Thailand.
- Jackson, Peter A. (2011). Queer Bangkok: 21st Century Markets, Media, and Rights. Hong Kong University Press. ISBN 9789888083046.
- Stapleton, William John (2011). The Twilight Soi. eBookIt.com. ISBN 9781456604011.
- Bangkok. Lonely Planet Publications. 2004.
