= Vongvanij family =

Thai Chinese family

Vongvanij ว่องวานิช
- Current region: Bangkok
- Origin: Hainan, China
- Founded: 1903
- Founder: Luan Vongvanij
- Properties: British Dispensary

The Vongvanij family (Thai: ว่องวานิช, pronounced [wɔ̂ŋ.wāː.nít]) is a Thai Chinese family. The family was founded by Luan Vongvanij, a Hainanese immigrant who settled in Siam in 1903 at the age of twelve. In 1928, he acquired the British Dispensary, a pharmaceutical company which continues to be owned by the family. The company passed onto his sons Boonchit and Boonyong in 1963 and from Boonyong to his son Anurut in 1993.

Notable people with the surname Vongvanij include:

- Arnond Vongvanij, Thai golfer
