= Harry A. Badman & Co. =

Historical department store in Bangkok

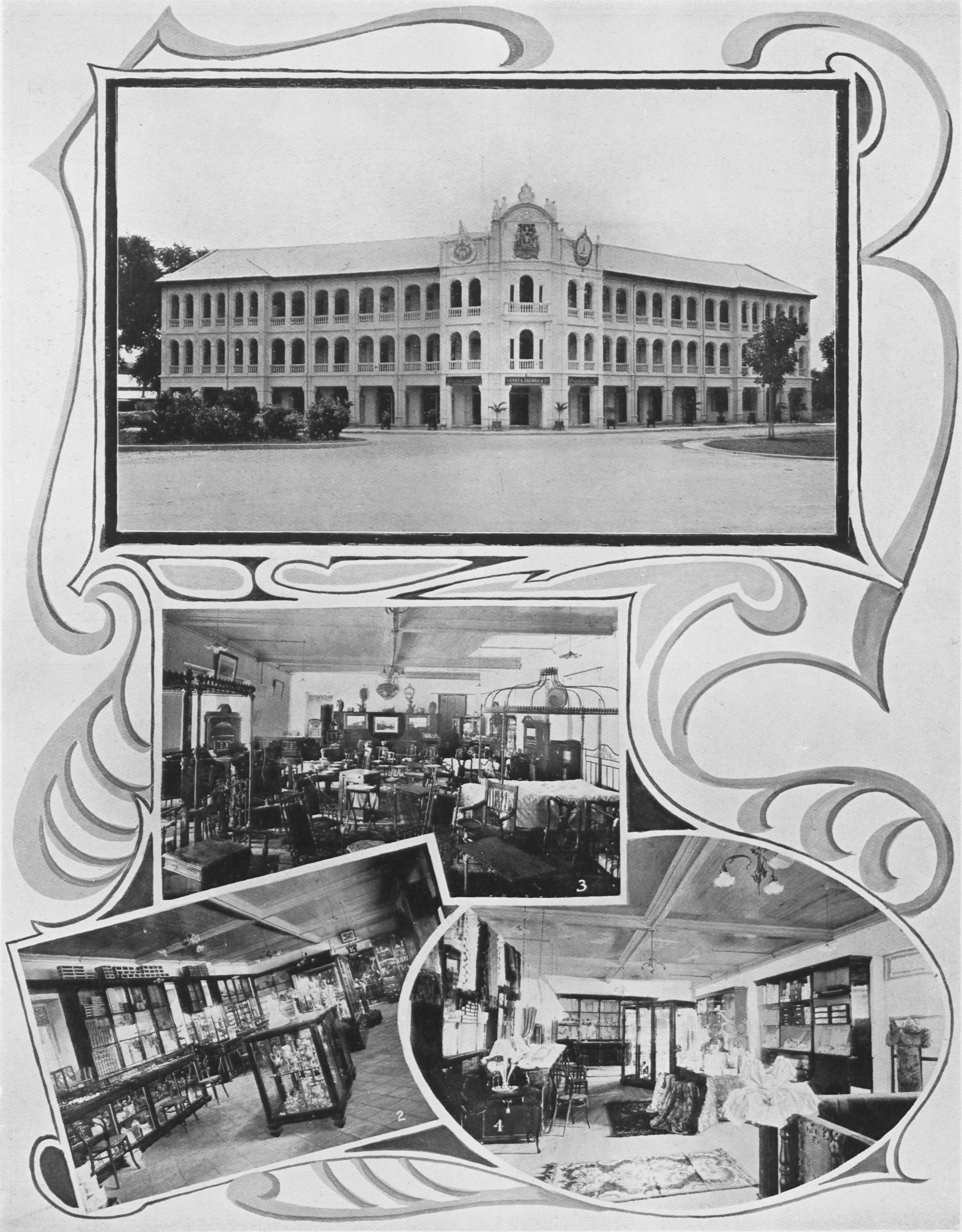
Harry A. Badman & Co., from Twentieth Century Impressions of Siam

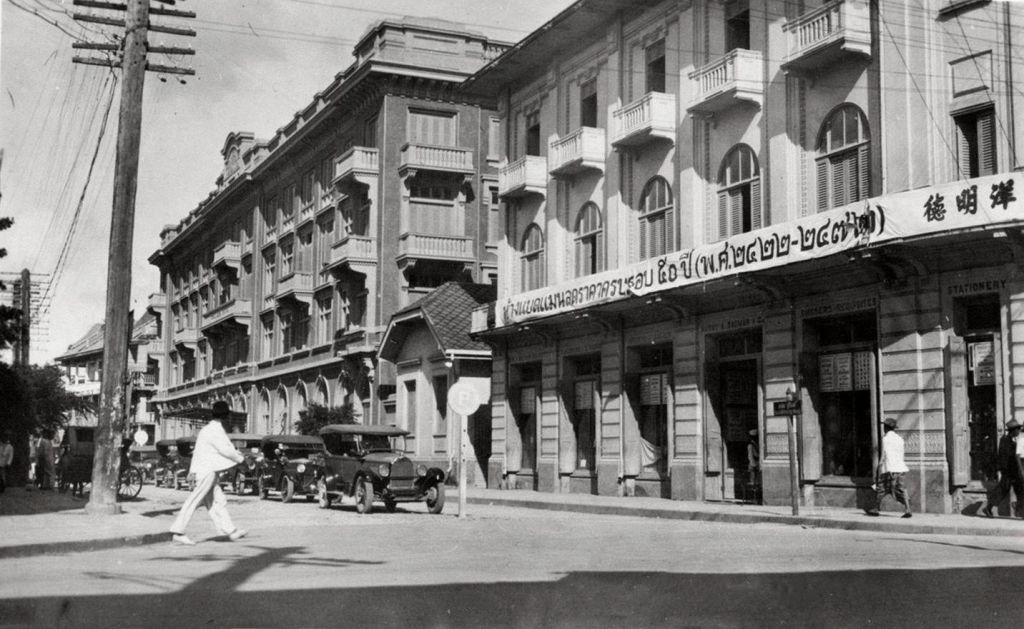
The new premises on Surawong Road, in 1929 (right)

Harry A. Badman & Co., known to local Thais as Hang Badman (Thai: ห้างแบดแมน, 'the Badman store'), was a department store in Bangkok, founded by English trader Harry A. Badman in March 1884. It was originally situated on Bamrung Mueang Road near the Ministry of Defence headquarters, before moving into a grand building on Ratchadamnoen Avenue, near Phan Phiphop Lila Bridge, which was formally opened by King Chulalongkorn on 5 December 1907 and started ordinary business on 9 December. The store was popular among the nobility and upper class, and was particularly known for European and American imported goods, as well as tailored clothing and military uniforms.

The 1908 publication Twentieth Century Impressions of Siam describes the business as follows:

For a quarter of a century and over Messrs. Harry A. Badman & Co. have held a leading position amongst the large retail stores in Siam, the rapid development of their business and the continual patronage and repeated marks of royal favour which they receive testifying to their popularity. The house was established by Mr. Badman on January 1, 1884, close to the Royal Barracks, and became known as No. 1, Bangkok, a name it retains to the present day.

With the growth of the city and the large demand for every kind of naval and military requirements the trade accruing to the firm increased from year to year, until recently the proprietors found it necessary to move into mere spacious premises specially erected for them in the vicinity of the King's palace and close to the Government offices. The building, which is an unusually handsome one, was opened by his Majesty on December 9, 1907, and special appointments have been granted to the firm by their Majesties the King and Queen and the Crown Prince, who take a great interest in the business.

The store is splendidly appointed and the goods in the various departments are displayed in most attractive fashion. The firm do not confine themselves to any particular branch of trade, but conduct a business on the line of the departmental stores. They have their specialities, however, and as naval, military and civil tailors and outfitters have a reputation which is unequalled in Siam. They are direct importers from Europe and America, and have their own buying house in London, at 45, Finsbury Pavement.

In 1892 Mr. Badman retired from the business in Siam, and established himself as the firm's buying agent in London, Mr. Hooker being admitted to partnership. Mr. C. S. George then joined the firm, and in 1897 became a partner. Ten successful years followed, and in 1907 Mr. George retired, leaving Mr. Hooker sole proprietor. Mr. A. C. Warwick, who had been for upwards of ten years manager of the Army and Navy Co-operative Society, Bombay, became associated with the enterprise on Mr. George's retirement; and in March, 1908, when Mr. Hooker, who had been for twenty-five years resident in Siam, also retired, he took over the business in partnership with Messrs. J. P. Gaudy and L. T. Gandy, both of whom had been with the firm for many years.

The business later acquired newer premises on Surawong Road, and celebrated its 50th anniversary there in 1929, but closed down sometime later. The Ratchadamnoen building later became the headquarters of the government's Publicity Department (now the Public Relations Department) from 1935 to 1961, when it was demolished and replaced by a newer building (which in turn was destroyed by fire during the Black May events in 1992).
