= Thomas Heyward Hays =

American surgeon in Siam

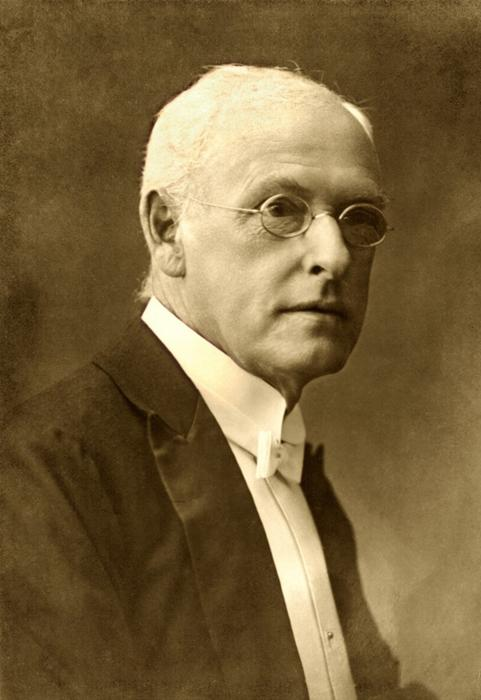
T. Heyward Hays

Thomas Heyward Hays (21 September 1854 – 2 February 1924) was an American surgeon who lived and worked in Siam (now Thailand), overseeing some of the country's first hospitals. He arrived in Bangkok with the Presbyterian Mission Agency, and subsequently entered government service, serving as chief physician of the Royal Siamese Navy and head of the Bangrak Hospital (now Lerdsin Hospital). He was also one of the first lecturers at the Royal Medical College (now the Siriraj Hospital Faculty of Medicine).

The 1908 publication Twentieth Century Impressions of Siam describes his biography as follows:

Dr. T. Heyward Hays, who now holds the combined positions of Principal Medical Officer to H.S.M.'s Navy, Medical Adviser to the Royal Railway Department, and Superintending Surgeon of the Bangrak Hospital, is one of the oldest medical practitioners in Siam. He obtained his professional training in America, and arriving at Bangkok in October, 1886, he shortly afterwards entered the Government service, at the frequent and earnest solicitations of H.R.H. Prince Damrong, as the Chief Superintendent of the Government hospitals, which at one time were four in number—the Buripah, Tapaserin, Wang Lang, and Bangrak hospitals. Since then he has undertaken many responsibilities and carried out a great deal of important work tending towards the improvement of the medical administration of the country generally. He opened the present medical college, and was for some time the sole lecturer there in all branches of medical science. From 1892 to 1895 he was consulting physician to H.S.M.'s court.

Hays was also the proprietor of the British Dispensary, one of the first modern pharmacies in the country. He married Jennie Neilson, a Danish-born American Presbyterian missionary who had been in Siam since 1881, in 1887. Jennie would become a member of the Bangkok Ladies’ Library Association, and following her death in 1920, Hays commissioned a permanent building for the library in her memory, now known as the Neilson Hays Library.

Hays died in 1924, aged 69. He and his wife are buried at the Bangkok Protestant Cemetery.
