= Womanifesto =

International art exchange based in Thailand

Womanifesto an international art exchange program based in Thailand. It is a biannual artist-initiated event focusing on the work of women artists from around the world. Womanifesto has gained international recognition and developed steadily since the first event in 1995. Through various activities, including art exhibitions, workshops and seminars, Womanifesto develops networks among participating artists and encourages interaction within urban and rural communities. The initiative offers a way to rethink feminist, nation-centric, and region-centric narratives of art history.

"Between 1997 and 2008, the feminist biennial Womanifesto in Thailand sought to create networks in art and activism that enacted gender equity and socio-economic justice at a time when biennials in Asia were taking shape," writes Emily Verla Bovino in Ocula Magazine, reporting on Womanifesto's efforts, as charted by Asia Art Archive in an exhibition in Hong Kong in 2020.

In October–November 2019, the Cross Art Projects, a nonprofit curatorial initiative based in Sydney, presented an exhibition titled Archiving Womanifesto: An International Art Exchange, 1990s–Present, where artists Varsha Nair, Nitaya Ueareeworakul, Phaptawan Suwannakudt acted as curators. In July–November 2020, Asia Art Archive, a nonprofit arts organization based in Hong Kong, hosted an exhibition about the history of Womanifesto and the role of pedagogy in this initiative.

== Events ==
=== Tradisexion, 1995 ===
In 1995, a group of women artists, writers and activists from Thailand organized a feminist art exhibition titled Tradisexion at Concrete House, an alternative art space in Bangkok. The exhibition featured paintings, installations, and performances by women artists from Thailand. 1995 also marked the year for the World Conference on Women, organized by the United Nations, which was crucial in the history of feminism as governments from different parts of the world agreed on a plan for global legal equality for women.

=== Womanifesto I, 1997 ===
Womanifesto I presented an exhibition held at Concrete House and Baan Chao Phraya (Chaiyong Limtongkul Foundation). It was organized by artists Nitaya Ueareeworakul, Acharn Somporn Rodboon, Varsha Nair, and Ark Fongsamut, and featured eighteen artists from ten countries, including Nilofar Akmut, Amanda Heng, Arahmaiani, Pinaree Sanpitak, and Phaptawan Suwannakudt.

=== Womanifesto II, 1999 ===
In 1999, Womanifesto II was held at Saranrom Park, Bangkok. Featuring installations and performances across the park, this edition presented more than thirty participants such as Sanja Iveković, Mella Jaarsma, Sriwan Janehattakarnkit, and Jittima Pholsawek, and it was organized by Nitaya Ueareeworakul, Pantini Chamnianwai and Studio Xang.

=== Womanifesto Workshop, 2001 ===
The format of the Womanifesto events has changed with the later iterations. In 2001, Womanifesto organizers held a ten-day workshop with a group of thirteen artists, including Lawan Jirasuradej, Yin Xiuzhen, Karla Sachse, and Hiroko Inoue, at Boon Bandarn Farm in Sisaket, in the Isan region. The participants were asked to think together about the position of women in the rural community and how women passed on knowledge across generations. This edition was organized by Preenun Nana, Varsha Nair, Naomi Urabe, Nitaya Ueareeworakul, and Pan Parahom. The participating artists learned skills from local craftspeople, such as basketry and weaving; organized workshops for local students; and developed projects with the locals, such as building a kiln.

=== Procreation/Postcreation, 2003 ===
In 2003, Procreation/Postcreation was produced as a publication with an open call to artists and non-artists, including male and female individuals or collectives. It was organized by Preenun Nana and Varsha Nair. Featuring eighty-eight contributions, the publication was created in the form of a box and collected personal stories, recipes, and poems, among others. In the same year, Womanifesto website was launched.

=== No Man's Land, 2005–06 ===
In 2005–06, Womanifesto organizers created the website project exploring nationalism. Titled No Man's Land, this project was organised by Varsha Nair and Katherine Olston, with Keiko Sei as an advisor. It was funded by Heinrich Boell Foundation. It presented works by seventy-five participants from across the world.

=== Womanifesto Workshop, 2008–09 ===
In 2008–09, Womanifesto organizers held an artist-in-residence program at Boon Bandan Farm, which deepened their involvement with nearby communities. This one-month-long residency allowed artists to develop projects over time and showed how contemporary artistic practice could interact with traditional crafts and involve local groups at the same time . It was organised by Varsha Nair, Nitaya Ueareeworakul, Phaptawan Suwannakudt, and supported by Office of Contemporary Art, Ministry of Culture, Thailand.
