= Paiboon Suwannakudt =

Thai artist

Paiboon Suwannakudt (1925–1982) was a Thai artist.

== Biography ==
Paiboon was born in 1925. He received his early education from Prachanukul School, Missionary Sevenday Adventis, and Benjamamaharaj School. Later, he attended the School of Arts and Crafts and received a Diploma in Painting and Sculpture from Silpakorn University. He was one of the students of Silpa Bhirasri at the university.

During his career, he also taught at the Sirisart School for two years.

He died in 1982. His daughter, Phaptawan Suwannakudt, is also an artist based in Australia.
