= Chao Phraya River Cable Car =

Overview
- Construction cost: 2 billion Baht
- Open: 2029

Operation
- Owner: Asset World Corporation

The Chao Phraya River Cable Car (Thai: เคเบิ้ลคาร์รักษ์โลก ข้ามแม่น้ำเจ้าพระยา กรุงเทพมหานคร) is a planned cable car across the Chao Phraya River in Bangkok, Thailand, connecting Asiatique in Bang Kho Laem district and a new mixed-use development on Charoen Nakhon road in Khlong San district, along with the MONA Bangkok.

The project is expected to cost 2 billion Baht.

== History ==
The cable car was announced in a ceremony on 10 July 2026 at the Athenee Bangkok Hotel by Asset World Corporation (AWC) as part of an 8 billion Baht investment in Asiatique.
