= Panote Sirivadhanabhakdi =

Panote Sirivadhanabhakdi (Thai: ปณต สิริวัฒนภักดี) is a Thai businessman and CEO of Frasers Property, a Singapore-based real estate development firm.

In 2016, Panote was named CEO of Frasers. He has overseen the development of One Bangkok, a $4 billion mixed-used project that includes Thailand's tallest building.

He is the youngest son of Thai Chinese billionaire Charoen Sirivadhanabhakdi (Su Xuming), the founder and chairman of ThaiBev.
