= TCC Group =

TCC Group may refer to:

- TCC Group (Thailand), an umbrella name for the holdings of the Sirivadhanabhakdi family
- TCC Group (Taiwan), the conglomerate umbrella of Taiwan Cement
