= Sirivadhanabhakdi family =

Thai business family

The Sirivadhanabhakdi family (Thai: สิริวัฒนภักดี) is a Sino-Thai business family and one of the wealthiest in Thailand. The family is headed by Charoen Sirivadhanabhakdi, who made his fortune in the alcoholic beverages business and has since, through many major acquisitions, expanded the family's holdings into other food and drink properties, real estate, retail, and other industries. The family has controlling stakes in the listed companies ThaiBev, Oishi Group, Berli Jucker, Big C Supercenter, Fraser and Neave, Frasers Property, Asset World Corporation, among others, held both directly and under their holdings banner TCC Group. It is regarded as one of the big five business families that dominate business in Thailand.

== History ==
Charoen was born in Bangkok in 1944, the second of eleven children. His father, a street vendor, was a Teochew immigrant from Shantou, among the last generation of immigrants to arrive before the Chinese Communist Revolution ended migration in 1949. The family, of the Soh/Su (蘇) clan, first took the Thai surname Srisomburananont (ศรีสมบูรณานนท์). The name Sirivadhanabhakdi—from Pali siri 'prosperity' + vaḍḍhana 'increasing' + Sanskrit bhakti 'devotion'—was granted to Charoen and his descendants by King Bhumibol Adulyadej in 1988.

Charoen has five children with his wife Wanna Sirivadhanabhakdi (1943–2023): Atinant Bijananda, Wallapa Traisorat, Thapana Sirivadhanabhakdi, Thapanee Techajareonvikul, and Panote Sirivadhanabhakdi. They have since taken up executive positions in various branches of the family's business empire.

=== People ===
Family members include:

- Charoen Sirivadhanabhakdi (born 1944), Thai billionaire businessman
- Wanna Sirivadhanabhakdi (วรรณา สิริวัฒนภักดี; 2 March 1943–17 March 2023), wife of Charoen; served several executive positions including Vice-Chairwoman of ThaiBev.
- Atinant Bijananda, eldest daughter
  - Chotiphat Bijananda, husband of Atinant
- Wallapa Traisorat, second daughter
  - Soammaphat Traisorat, husband of Wallapa
- Thapana Sirivadhanabhakdi (born 1974/75), third child and elder son, CEO of ThaiBev
  - Papatchya Sirivadhanabhakdi (née Thienprasiddhi), wife of Thapana
- Thapanee Techajareonvikul
  - Aswin Techajareonvikul, husband of Thapanee
- Panote Sirivadhanabhakdi
  - Trinuch Chakrabandh Sirivadhanabhakdi, wife of Panote

== TCC Group ==
Logo of TCC Group

The family has extensive business properties spanning several industries, held both directly by its individual members and through a network of holding companies collectively branded as TCC Group.

=== Food and beverage ===
ThaiBev (Note: Public company)
Producer of Chang beer and other alcoholic beverages
Fraser and Neave
Singapore-based food and drink conglomerate, acquired in 2013
Sermsuk
Producer of Est Cola and other non-alcoholic beverages
Oishi Group
Ready-to-drink tea beverages and restaurant chains

=== Industrial and trading business ===
Most businesses in this group are under Berli Jucker, a long-standing industrial conglomerate founded in 1882, of which Charoen acquired a majority in 2001.

Berli Jucker
Manufacture and distribution of consumer and healthcare products, among various other businesses
Berli Jucker Foods
Packaged snacks
Berli Jucker Logistics
Retail logistics services
Asia Books
Bookstore chain
Rubia Industries
Soap, cosmetics and confectionery manufacturer
TCC Technology
IT services
Thai Glass Industries
Glass packaging (jars and bottles)
Thai-Scandic Steel
Galvanized steel structures

=== Finance and insurance ===
This group originated as Southeast Insurance in 1946, and expanded into other services.

Southeast Insurance
Insurance; liquidated following heavy losses in the COVID-19 pandemic
Southeast Life Insurance
Life insurance
Southeast Capital
Fleet vehicle leasing

=== Property and real estate ===
This group operates as TCC Land, Asset World Corporation, Golden Land, Univentures, and other associated companies. It has done property development in the following categories:

Hospitality
Owns a large number of hotels, mostly operated by international chain brands
Retail
Developer of shopping centres, including Pantip Plaza and Asiatique
Commercial offices
Properties include Empire Tower
Residential development
Several condominium towers
MICE
NCC Management and Development operates Queen Sirikit National Convention Center
Leisure
Rajpruek Club and other golf courses
Master planning
Large-scale development, including the One Bangkok mega-project

=== Agriculture and agro-industry ===
The group has several agricultural business interests in the following areas:

Plantations and processing
Vertically integrated agri-businesses in several crops including rubber (Lastica), pineapples (Siam Food, one of the largest exporters globally), oil palms, and coffee
Sugar
Operating under the Cristalla brand, with associated ethanol production by Thai Alcohol
Related businesses
Fertilizers and other services under the Terragro group
Agricultural commodities trading
Done by Plantheon Trading

=== Retail ===
Charoen acquired a majority in Big C Supercenter in 2016.
