= Hotel Plaza Athénée (New York City) =

Hotel in Manhattan, New York

Coordinates: 40.766621°N 73.968388°W

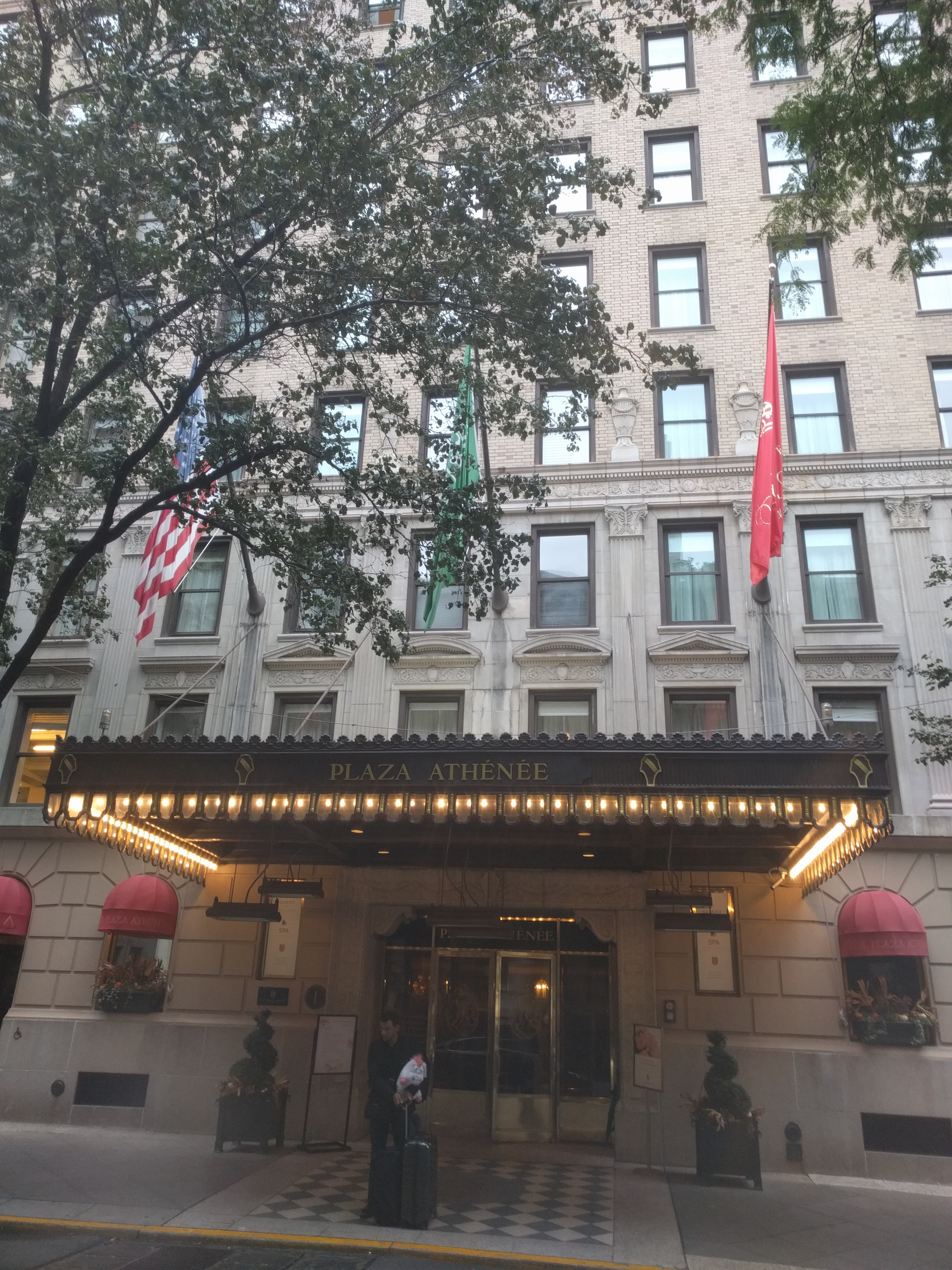

The Hotel Plaza Athénée was a 5-star hotel at 37 East 64th Street, between Park Avenue and Madison Avenue, on the Upper East Side of Manhattan in New York City. It was a seventeen-story apartment and transient hotel building, and has been resold by Louis Schleifer (operator to the Ira Fischer Syndicate), in a transaction negotiated by Jack Stein of L. V.

== History ==
The Alrae Hotel opened in 1927 as an apartment-hotel. It was designed by George F. Pelham, and was sold to Louis Schleifer in July 1950. Schleifer resold the hotel in June 1951 to the Ira Fischer Syndicate.

The hotel was sold to Trusthouse Forte Hotels in 1981 and was completely gutted and renovated as a luxury hotel. It reopened in September 1984 as the 160-room Hotel Plaza Athénée, named for the famed Hotel Plaza Athénée in Paris, another Trusthouse Forte property at the time. It included an elegant French restaurant, La Régence, supervised by noted chef Daniel Boulud. Granada plc bought Forte in 1996 and sold the hotel to Thai billionaire Charoen Sirivadhanabhakdi's TCC Group, for £42.5 million in 1997.

The hotel closed on March 26, 2020, due to the COVID-19 pandemic.

It is set to reopen in 2026 as Plaza Athenee Nobu Hotel and Spa New York, a joint venture between Sirivadhanabhakdi's Asset World Corp Public Company Limited and Nobu Hospitality. It will have 145 rooms, a traditional Japanese Onsen, a spa, a wellness center, a Nobu omakase restaurant, a bar and lounge, and a rooftop reception space.
