= Hotel Plaza Athénée =

Hotel Plaza Athénée may refer to the following:

- Plaza Athénée, Paris
- Hotel Plaza Athénée (New York City)
