= Bangkok Marriott Hotel The Surawongse =

Hotel in Thailand

- โรงแรม แบงค็อก แมริออท เดอะ สุรวงศ์
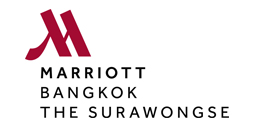
- Logo
- Interactive map of the Bangkok Marriott Hotel The Surawongse area
- Hotel chain: Marriott Hotels & Resorts

General information
- Type: Hotel
- Classification: 5 stars
- Location: 262 Surawong Road, Si Phraya, Bang Rak district, Bangkok, Thailand
- Coordinates: 13°43′39″N 100°31′20″E
- Opening: 3 April 2018
- Owner: Asset World Corporation

Technical details
- Floor count: 32

Other information
- Number of rooms: 197
- Number of suites: 106
- Number of restaurants: 2
- Number of bars: 1

Website
- Official website

The Bangkok Marriott Hotel The Surawongse (Thai: โรงแรม แบงค็อก แมริออท เดอะ สุรวงศ์) is a hotel in Bangkok, Thailand, that is part of the Marriott Hotels & Resorts brand. Owned by Asset World Corporation, the five-star hotel opened in 2018. The 32-floor building has 197 rooms and 106 suites. For hosting events, the hotel has two reception venues and 14 banquet spaces. The hotel has an infinity pool, a gym, and a spa.

The Surawongse has two restaurants and a bar. The third-floor Praya Kitchen, a buffet with Thai cuisine as the focal point, serves western dishes, sushi, and seafood. The 32nd-floor Yào Restaurant serves Shanghai cuisine, dim sum, and Cantonese delicacies. The 33rd-floor Yào Rooftop Bar serves Chinese snacks, bar food, and Chinese-inspired cocktails. The hotel has two lounges: the M Club Lounge is for customers staying in certain suites, while the Lobby Lounge serves tea.

== History ==
Built in 1957, the Surawongse House influenced the design of Bangkok Marriott Hotel The Surawongse, specifically in the hotel's rooms, lobby, and common area. The hotel showcases various types of art pieces including textiles, murals, and sculptures from Khīan Yimsiri. The Surawongse commenced operations on 3 April 2018. The 32-story hotel is a five-star hotel. The Surawongse in 2019 hosted "Michelin Star Revelation Thailand", an event during which the Michelin Guide announced which restaurants would be granted stars. The hotel's owner is Asset World Corporation (AWC). Alongside five other AWC hotels, it was temporarily shut for a period in 2020 owing to the COVID-19 pandemic in Thailand.

== Location ==
Located in a low-key area of downtown Bangkok on Surawong Road, the Surawongse is situated opposite the Neilson Hays Library and the British Club. It is near the business districts of Sathon and Si Lom. It is midway between Sukhumvit Road, a busy road, and Chao Phraya River's historical attractions. Cultural landmarks near the hotel are the Bangkok Folk Museum, the Sri Maha Mariamman Temple, and Charoen Krung Soi 32's street art. Customers can ask for and receive from the hotel a small map showing key attractions in the area. The Surawongse provides customers transportation via van to the Sala Daeng BTS station, which is a 15-minute walk from the hotel. The Surawongse is a 40-minute taxi ride away from both of Bangkok's international airports, Don Mueang International Airport and Suvarnabhumi Airport.

== Amenities ==
=== Guest rooms ===
There are 197 rooms and 106 suites that are designed like apartments. It has accessible rooms modified to accommodate disabled guests. The Surawongse's rooms have windows that span from the ceiling to the floor. They are decorated with bronze sculptures and glass panels ornamented with village settings. The walls of the rooms and the doors of the glass showers feature traditional Thai art. Each restroom has marble finishes and is equipped with a shower with rain shower heads and a bathtub. The hotel's suites are between one and three bedrooms. Each suite has a sitting space surrounding a circular table, a walk-in closet, a washing machine, and a tiny kitchen. The one-bedroom suites are sufficient for one or two people, while the larger suites are suitable for families. Tom Vater of The Daily Telegraph found the rooms to be too tight but praised the furniture, saying it was "in top condition, a little understated, minimalistic and quietly luxurious, making for an adult hotel experience". Lifestyle Asia reviewer Pearl Yan praised the room design, writing, "Wooden floors and earth-toned furniture are in harmony with the white ceiling and light-coloured pieces, creating open, airy spaces that are calming, uncluttered and filled with natural light."

=== Restaurants and bar ===
The Surawongse has two restaurants: Praya Kitchen, a buffet that primarily serves Thai cuisine, and Yào Restaurant, a venue that serves Shanghai and Cantonese cuisine. The hotel's Yào Rooftop Bar serves cocktails featuring Chinese influences and Chinese appetizer dishes.

==== Praya Kitchen ====
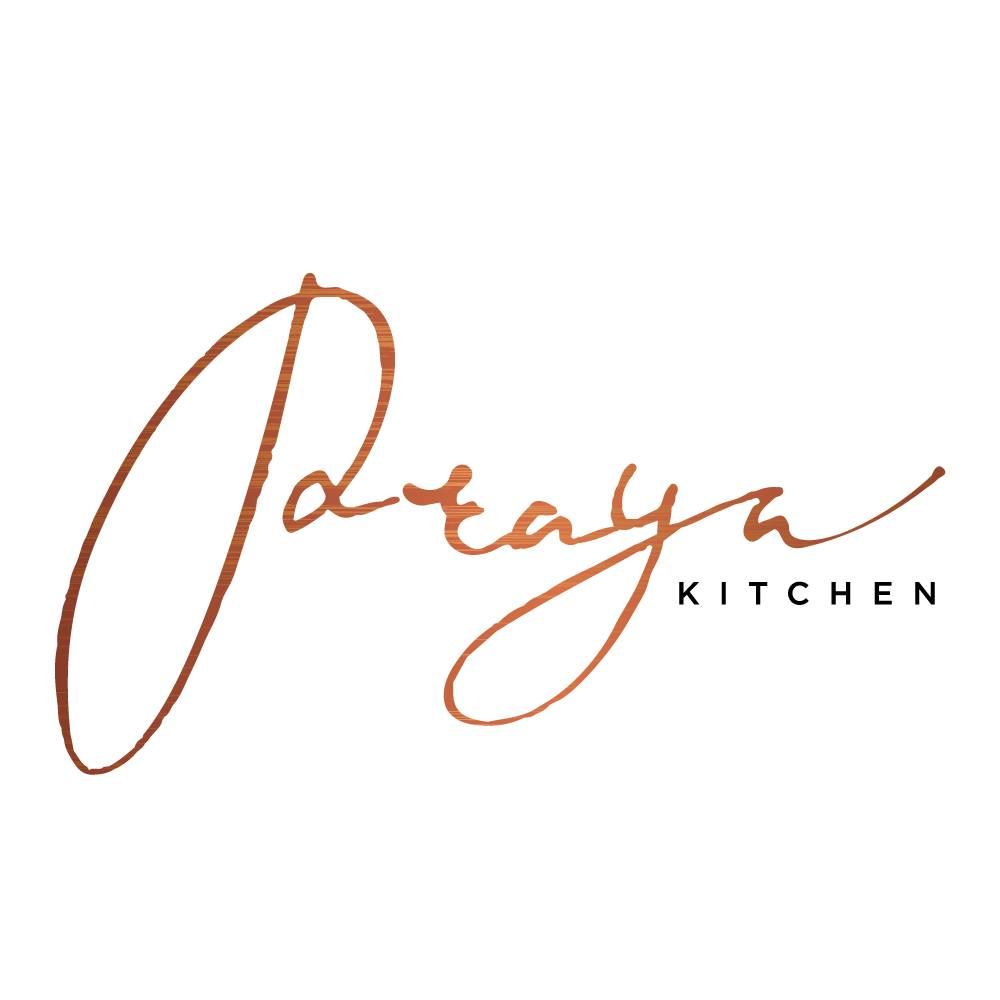
Praya Kitchen logo

The third-floor Praya Kitchen is a buffet that serves lunch and dinner. The name alludes to Chao Phraya River and evokes "senior Thai societal rank". With Thai cuisine as the focal point, it offers Thai street food and also serves sushi, western comfort food, and desserts. The restaurant's founding chef, Attapol "X" Naito Thangthong, relied on his grandmother's recipes to make the Thai dishes. Praya Kitchen serves dishes from the four Thai regions: northern, north-eastern, central, and southern. The restaurant has "more recent-but-forgotten kitsch classics" such as "Gai Ob Phu Kao Fai", which means "Chicken Volcano". Drenched in Mekhong whiskey, a rotisserie chicken is shown on the table in a scene that BK Magazine critic Kankanok Wichiantanon said hearkens back to "Thai fine dining of yesteryear". Khanom chin gaeng kua, another classic Thai dish, has rice noodles, fish curry, and Maine lobsters.

Praya Kitchen has areas where customers can bring seafood, vegetable, and meat dishes to be cooked in front of them in a sizzling wok. The restaurant's seafood offerings consist of scallops from Hokkaido, mussels, oysters, crabs, rock lobsters, and tiger prawns. Its meat options include "dry-aged Thai sirloin, Kurobuta pork, and New Zealand lamb". The Bangkok Post's Vanniya Sriangura opined that the most premium seafood selection was the river prawn, while the most premium meat selection was the Australian wagyu rib eye steak. She said the high demand caused both to be rapidly depleted. The restaurant's western dishes include foie gras and lobster bisque, which Sriangura praised. Dishes from Yào Restaurant, another hotel eatery, are featured in Praya Kitchen. Sriangura lauded the xiao long bao and Peking duck dishes but criticised the barbecued pork for being excessively sweet and missing the scorched smell. The Daily Telegraph's Tom Vater praised three dishes: pandanus leaf-wrapped chicken; som tam, a papaya salad dish; and mango cheesecake.

The restaurant's cocktails use Thai fruits. Examples are the "Asia Pacific Cooler", a vodka drink containing jasmine water blended with lychee purée and liqueur, and the "Pa-N Da-N", an unaged cachaça drink containing a mixture of honey, coconut, and pineapple. As to its decor, the restaurant features immense murals depicting the traditional Thai way of living in the royal court and in the country. Made of wood, the works are reproductions sourced from religious stories told in temple murals. Wichiantanon, the BK Magazine reviewer, said the murals "lend the vast open space a genuine sense of occasion" and praised the "easy-flowing music" the restaurant put on. Sriangura, the Bangkok Post reviewer, praised the restaurant's design of grouping the primary food stations in the venue's centre, which allowed customers to efficiently access the food.

==== Yào Restaurant ====
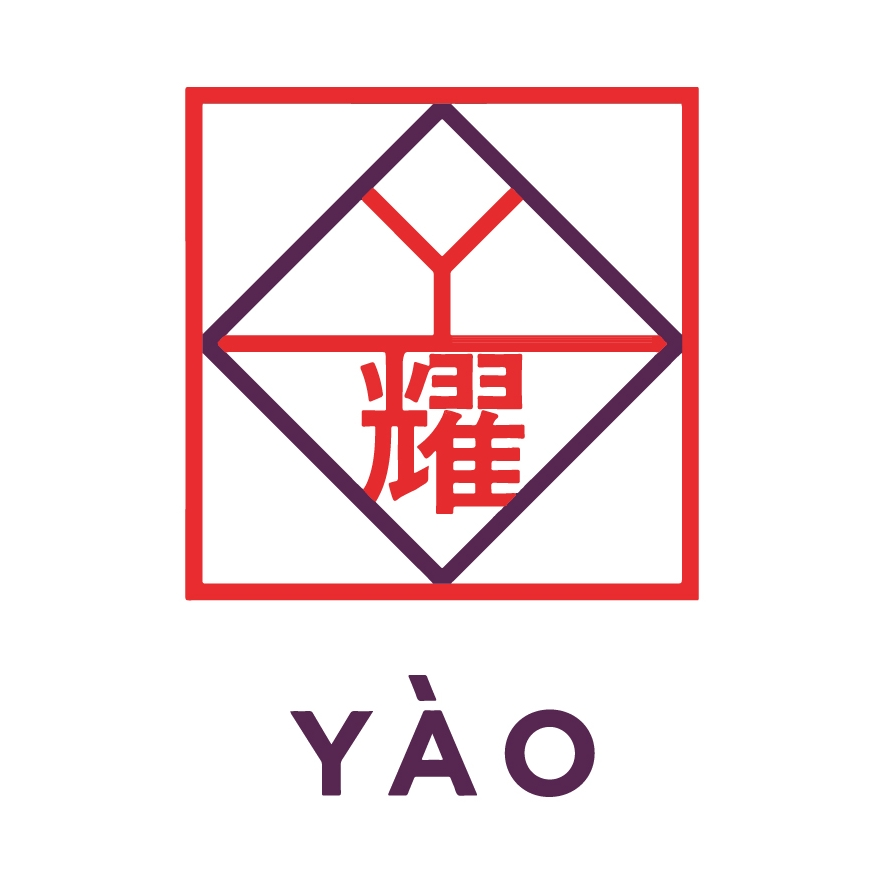
Yào Restaurant & Rooftop Bar logo containing the Chinese character 耀

The 32nd-floor Yào Restaurant serves Shanghai cuisine, dim sum, and Cantonese delicacies. In Mandarin, Yào (Chinese: 耀) means "glory". The name is showcased through the brass sculptures and intricate Chinese adornments. Yào's furnishings follow "chang sip mo", a Thai concept meaning "traditional craftsmanship". Examples are elaborate pagodas and works of art that mimic Henry Moore. The restaurant evokes Shanghai in the 1930s through its polished metalwork architecture. Through furnishings in dim and alluring shades, it is influenced by present-day Shanghai. Noel Maclean of the Bangkok Post said there are "vivid Shanghainese art deco influences" including the "bulbous teardrop chandeliers" and the ceramics imprinted with koi as well as napkins styled into wave formations. Maclean concluded, "The overall ambiance is that of internet age-updated halcyon-era Shanghai chic". Additional Chinese decorations are folding screens and hand-held fans. Yào has five rooms where guests can dine in private. The largest room has a 20-person occupancy. Yào offers Chinese fortune sticks for customers to try to select which tea to drink in a custom the restaurant named "des-tea-ny".

Chinese chefs oversee the cooks who prepare the food in the restaurant's kitchen. Yào serves a breakfast buffet with Asian food like congee and English breakfast options in conjunction with cereal, fruit, juice, lunch meat, and cheese. The dim sum lunch includes har gow and siu mai, which Time Out reviewer Phavitch Theeraphong called "tasty and sizeable". Another dim sum dish, xiaolongbao, is served in both the usual steamed way as well as in a fried way. According to Theeraphong, the fried xiaolongbao is a Shanghainese delicacy that is uncommon and difficult to find in other places and is perfectly complemented by Yào's housemade chili sauce. The Bangkok Post critic Noel Maclean lauded the dim sum dishes to be "outstanding for their size, firmness and crystal clear flavours". For the afternoon tea, the restaurant serves both savory dishes and desserts. The savory dishes include turnip cake that is pan fried and drenched in XO Sauce, xiao long bao, shrimp siu mai, cheese dumplings that are deep fried and contain crab, fish dumplings that are pan fried and contain green chives, and sake soy sauce-drenched baby abalone. The desserts include bird nest, custard puff pastry, macaron made of jujube, and sago containing cantaloupe and coconut milk.

The dinner dishes include a dish with fried green beans and tofu; Chinese bites; and lobster drenched in XO sauce made of prawn and oolong. Theeraphong said of the restaurant, "Yao may not wow you with eye-popping, elaborately presented dishes, but it does offer everything you would want for a decent Chinese meal." Lifestyle Asia critic Pearl Yan praised three dishes: mushroom soup containing tofu in the form of a flower, "steamed pork dumpling in oolong tea soup"; and hand-pulled noodles. When customers choose the hand-pulled noodles, the chef arrives in front of them to demonstrate the noodle pulling.

==== Yào Rooftop Bar ====
A 2020 video of the Yào Rooftop Bar

The 33rd-floor Yào Rooftop Bar seats 160 people and occupies two floors. It gives customers a panoramic view of their surroundings as they do al fresco dining. Yào Rooftop Bar makes use of numerous glass screens so the view is unobstructed. Visitors can see the Chao Phraya River, tower blocks, and Old Town. The Bangkok Post reviewer Noel Maclean described the bar as "two-tier, multi-level rock garden-like". The bar has a nostalgic Chinese style and its design is heavily shaped by contemporary Shanghainese style. The venue has circular tables adorned with flame-free candles and miniature orange trees, as well as chairs containing frames etched in the Chinese style. Evoking a roof garden, it has numerous potted plants placed around the venue. The bar largely plays contemporary Chinese music and periodically plays traditional tunes.

The bar's food and drinks are prepared by Yào Restaurant. It has Chinese snacks, bar food, and Chinese-inspired cocktails. The cocktail "Shanghai, City Upon Sea", is a dark purple drink containing butterfly pea flower, which is the source of the drink's colour. The purple colour honours the Shanghai TV tower Oriental Pearl Tower, which is bathed in a purple hue after dark. The "Chinese Highball" is a "punchy and potent" cocktail made with mango and bourbon, while the Shanghai Swings is a cocktail with a banana taste. The bar's menu has tinier food items than the Yào restaurant. It serves a gravy-drenched noodle dish containing spicy minced pork. Another dish is fried chicken made in the Sichuan way, which has a blend of "sweet, salty, hot and sour" flavours.

=== Lounges ===
The hotel has two lounges: the M Club Lounge and the Lobby Lounge. The M Club Lounge is available for only residents of four suite types: one-bedroom, Executive, Vice Presidential, and Presidential. It serves a small breakfast buffet containing cereal, fruit, hot plates, and à la carte selections. In the evening, it offers canapé and cocktails. Lifestyle Asia critic Pearl Yan lauded the lounge's design, calling it "a gorgeously decked-out space" replete with "stylish seating and lush carpets". The ground floor Lobby Lounge offers two kinds of tea options in the afternoon: traditional Thai and Western. Yan, the Lifestyle Asia reviewer, found the tea selections to be "scrumptious and visually appealing". She praised the lounge's decor for "espous[ing] refinement and timeless luxury over modern Thai-inspired design".

=== Facilities ===
The Surawongse has a tiny infinity pool and a gym that is open around the clock. The Daily Telegraph said the gym was large and gave customers an excellent view of the surroundings. Named the Quan Spa, the hotel's spa uses traditional Thai techniques to attend to customers. Designed to ease muscle tension and make people feel better, one spa option is Muay Thai-themed. There are four "treatment rooms" in the spa, of which one fits two people. The hotel has a club for children, though there is no staff supervision for the area. There is a children's pool that is connected to the larger pool.

The hotel allocated 1,555 square metres (16,740 sq ft) to hosting events. A 1,155-square-metre (12,430 sq ft) part of the hotel has two reception venues, 14 banquet spaces, and an exterior courtyard.

== Bibliography ==
- Zhao, Siyu 趙思語; Meng, Jinlan 蒙金蘭 (2023). 曼谷攻略完全制霸2023–2024 [Bangkok Strategy to Complete Dominance 2023–2024] (in Chinese). Taipei: Mook 墨刻. pp. 25, 250. ISBN 978-9-86289-861-1 – via Google Books.
