= Asiatique =

Open-air mall in Bangkok, Thailand

Coordinates: 13°42′22″N 100°30′17″E

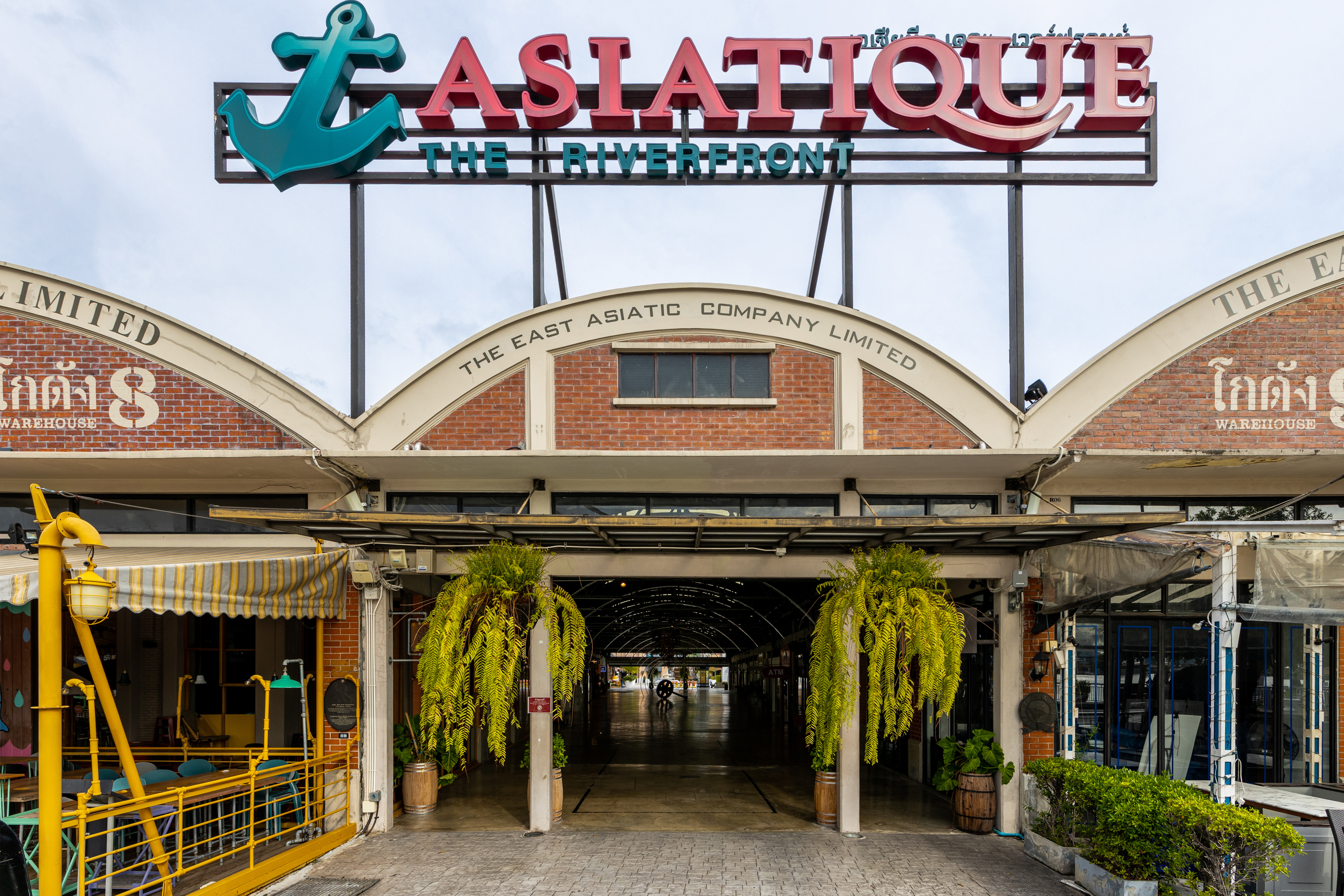
The entrance of Asiatique in 2021

Asiatique The Riverfront Destination, simply known as Asiatique is a large open-air mall in Bangkok, Thailand. It occupies the former docks of the East Asiatic Company, and faces the Chao Phraya River and Charoen Krung Road. The complex opened in 2012 after extensive renovation of the site.

== History ==
The Denmark-based East Asiatic Company was founded in 1897 and was one of several Western firms conducting trade with Siam at the time. The company owned port facilities on the Chao Phraya, which included several warehouses, the oldest extant building dating from 1907. The port ceased operations in 1947, and the facilities later fell into disuse. In May 2011, real estate company TCC Land announced its plans to renovate and develop the site into a retail/entertainment complex to be known as Asiatique The Riverfront.

Asiatique opened on 27 April 2012, and has been observed to fulfil a replacement role for the previously popular Suan Lum Night Bazaar, which had closed down in 2010. Access is by road (with a parking capacity of 2,000 cars) or by boat, with shuttle services from Sathon Pier. It is managed by Riverside Masterplan Co., Ltd., a subsidiary of TCC Land.

Since 2019, Asiatique has been managed by Asset World Corporation (AWC). In October 2021, AWC Chief Executive Officer Wallapa Traisorat announced a redevelopment plan which will include a super-tall skyscraper expected to be completed within nine years.

In July 2026, AWC announced an 8 billion Baht investment into Asiatique, including a cable car crossing the Chao Phraya River to connect with a new mixed-use development on Charoen Nakhon road, and the establishment of MONA Bangkok.

== Location and facilities ==
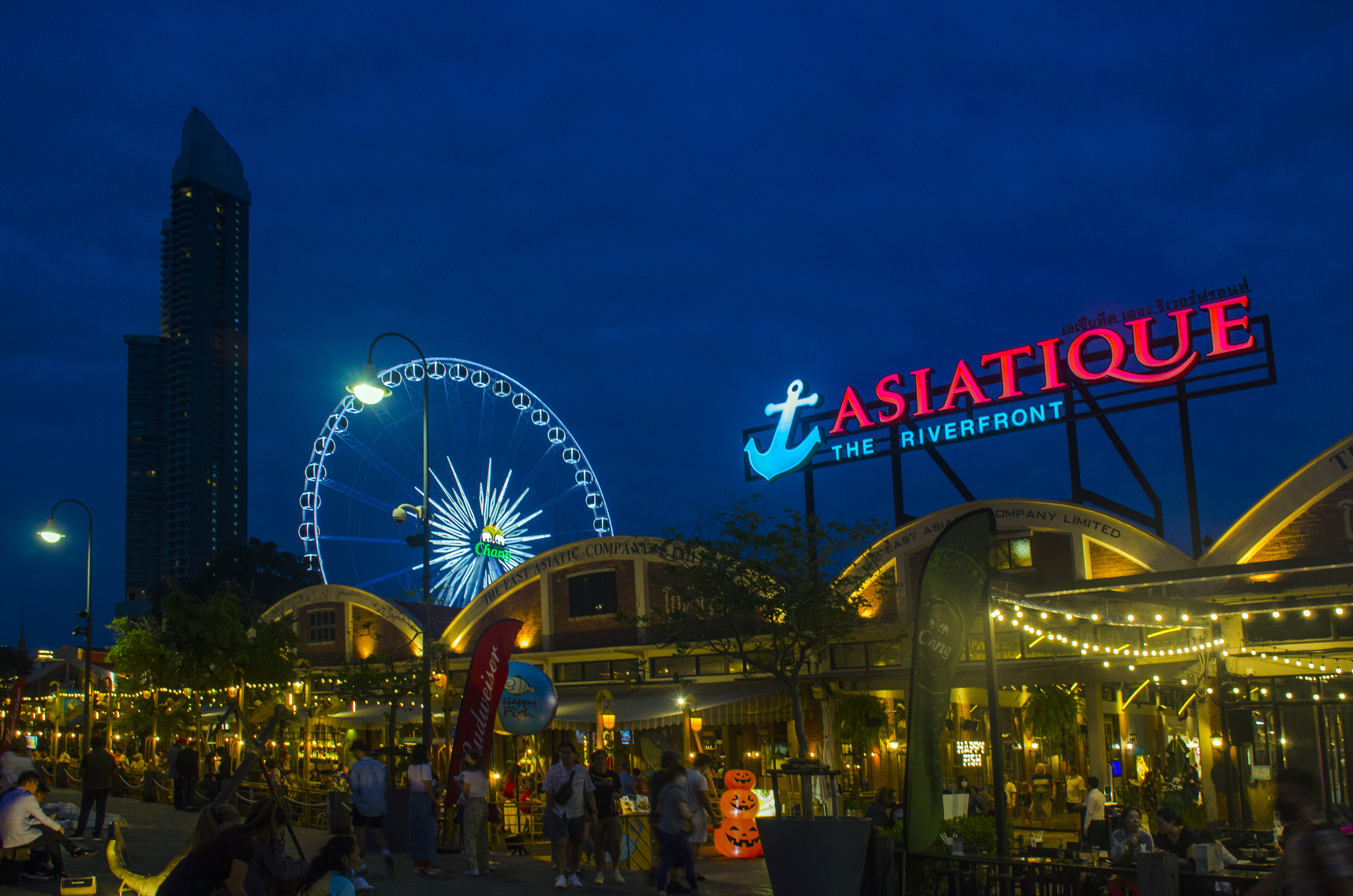
Asiatiquet at night in 2022

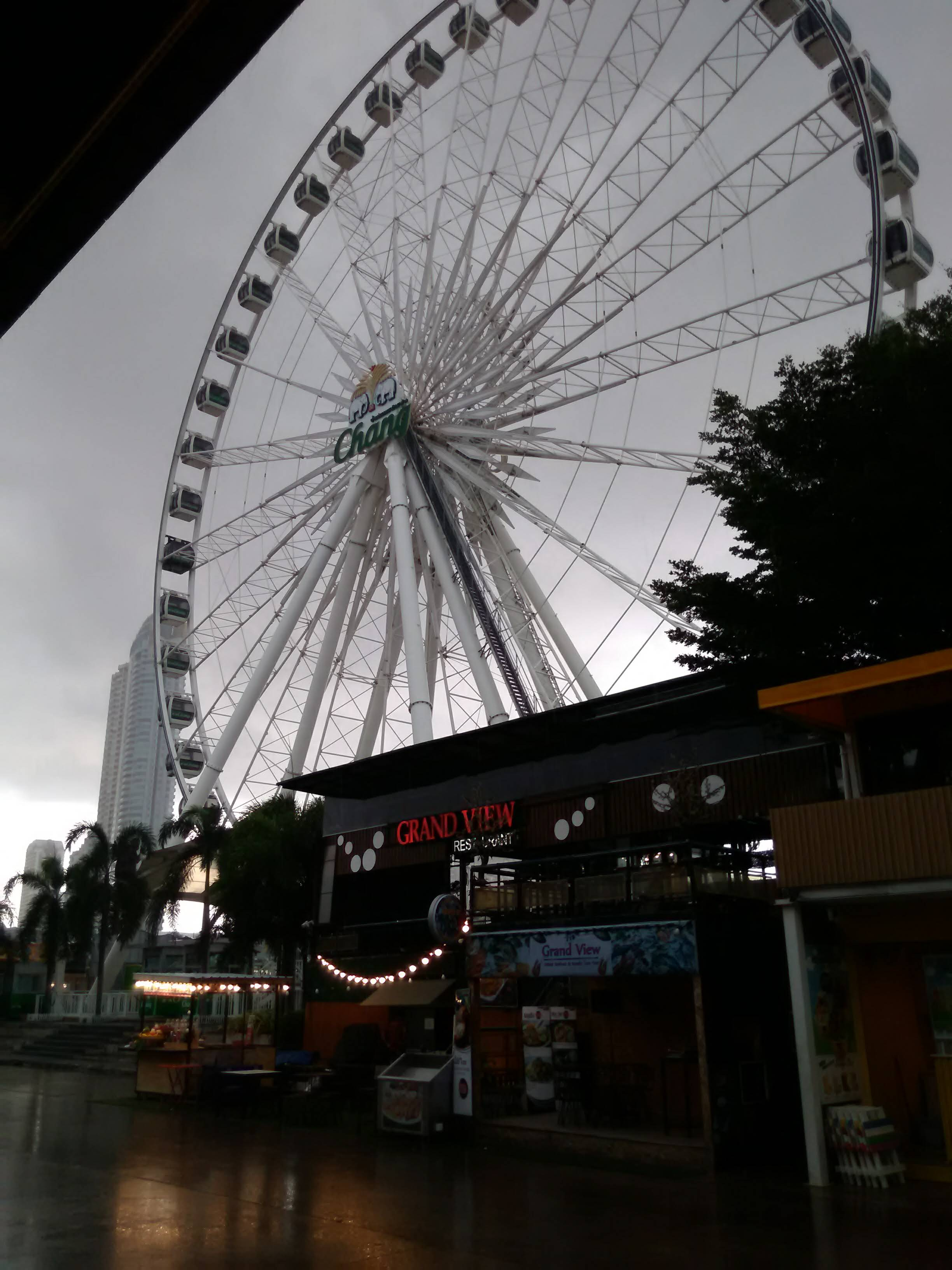
Asiatique Sky

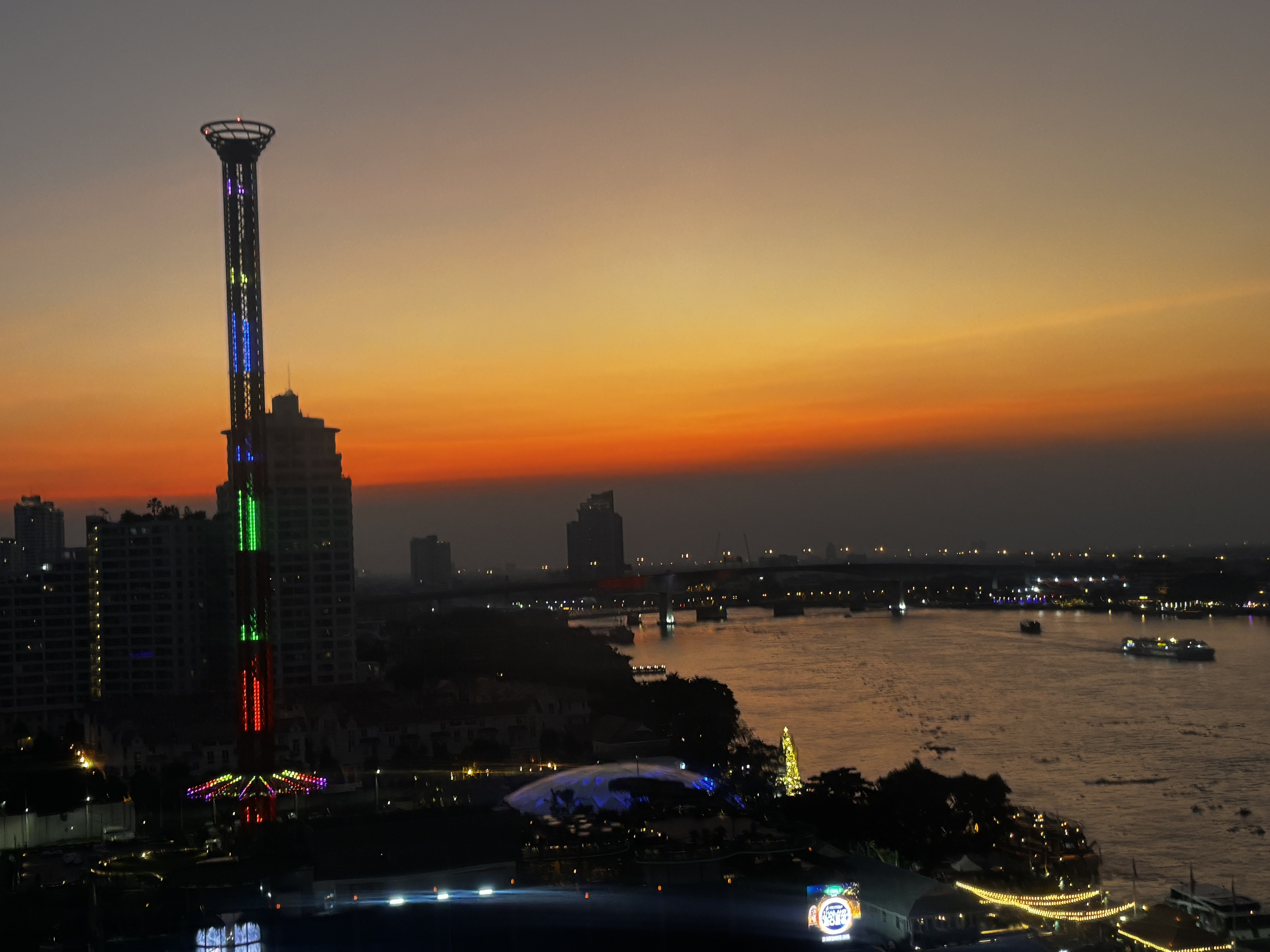
SkyFlyers, one of the rides in Asiatique

Asiatique is located on Charoen Krung Road in Bangkok's Bang Kho Laem District, facing the Chao Phraya River. It occupies 30 rai (4.8 hectares (12 acres)) of land, with plans for future expansion to include a total of 72 rai (11.52 hectares (28.5 acres)) of mixed-use development. The mall, featuring a historical theme from the period of King Chulalongkorn's reign (1868–1910), operates as an open-air night market. It features 1,500 shops and stalls and 40 restaurants, most of which are housed in the former warehouses. Other historical buildings and objects include an old sawmill and a World War II bomb shelter. There is a parking lot tram designed to look like a car from Bangkok's former tram system, and the site is decorated with bronze statues representing maritime activity.

The mall's layout is divided into four thematic sections, called districts. Chareonkrung [sic] District is named after Charoen Krung Road, and contains performing venues for the Calypso Cabaret show, as well as shops selling handicrafts and souvenirs. It previously also hosted the Joe Louis Traditional Thai Puppet Theatre and live Muay Thai performances. Town Square District features foreign restaurants and sports bars, and includes a small event space. Factory District focuses on trendy fashions, products and restaurants. Waterfront District lies along Asiatique's waterfront promenade—claimed to be Bangkok's longest at 300 metres (980 ft)—and includes several riverside restaurants, a large event space used for concerts, festivals and New Year celebrations, and Asiatique Sky, the tallest Ferris wheel in Bangkok at 60 metres (200 ft).

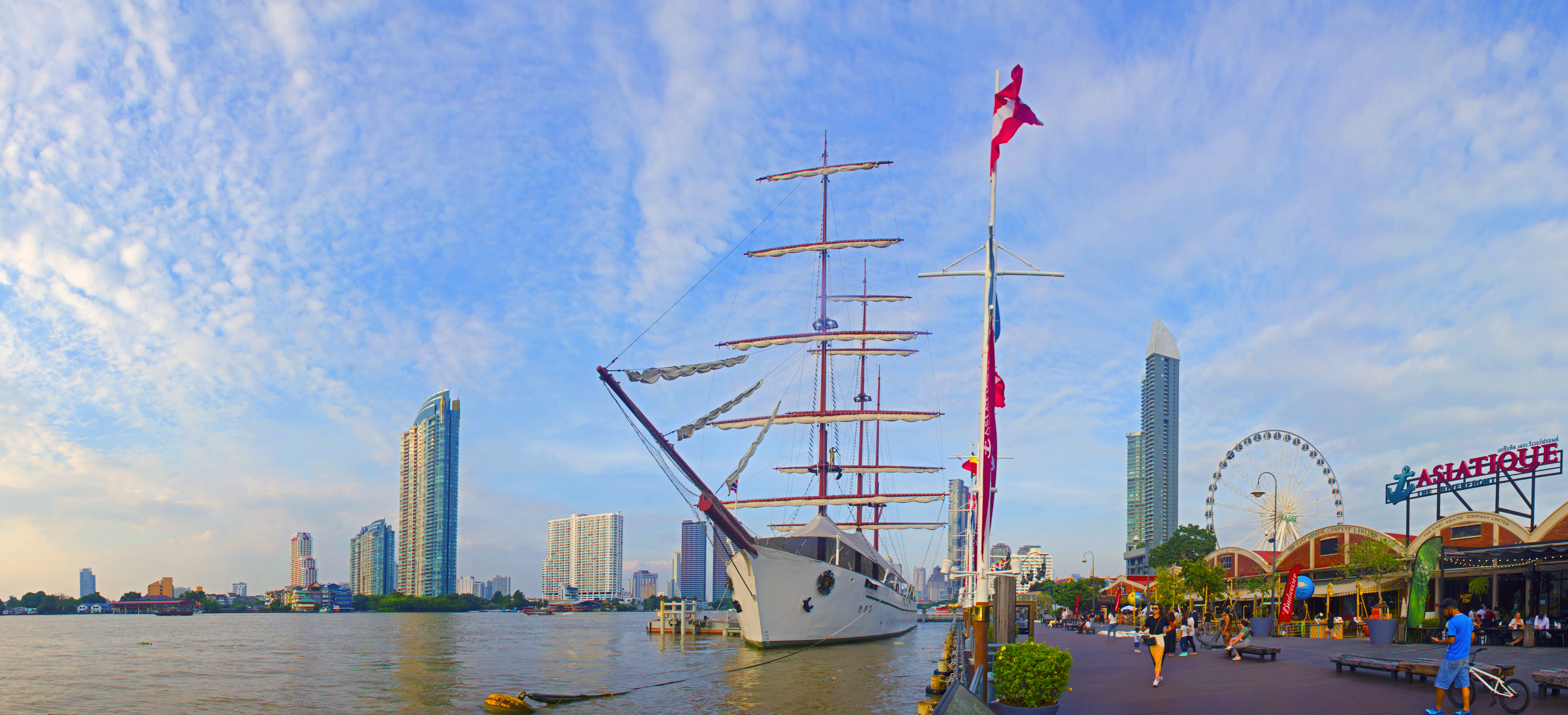
Sirimahannop heritage ship anchor at Asiatique The Riverfront

- Sirimahannop heritage ship is a replica of the ship Thoon Kramom, which was a merchant barque captained by East Asiatic Company founder Hans Niels Andersen. The three-mast tall ship dominates the sky line of the Asiatique. It serves as a fine dining restaurant, along with a display of old photographs, charts, diagrams and models.

== See also ==
- East Asiatic Building, former offices of the EAC
