= One Bangkok =

Mixed use development in Bangkok, Thailand

Coordinates: 13.7272°N 100.5473°E

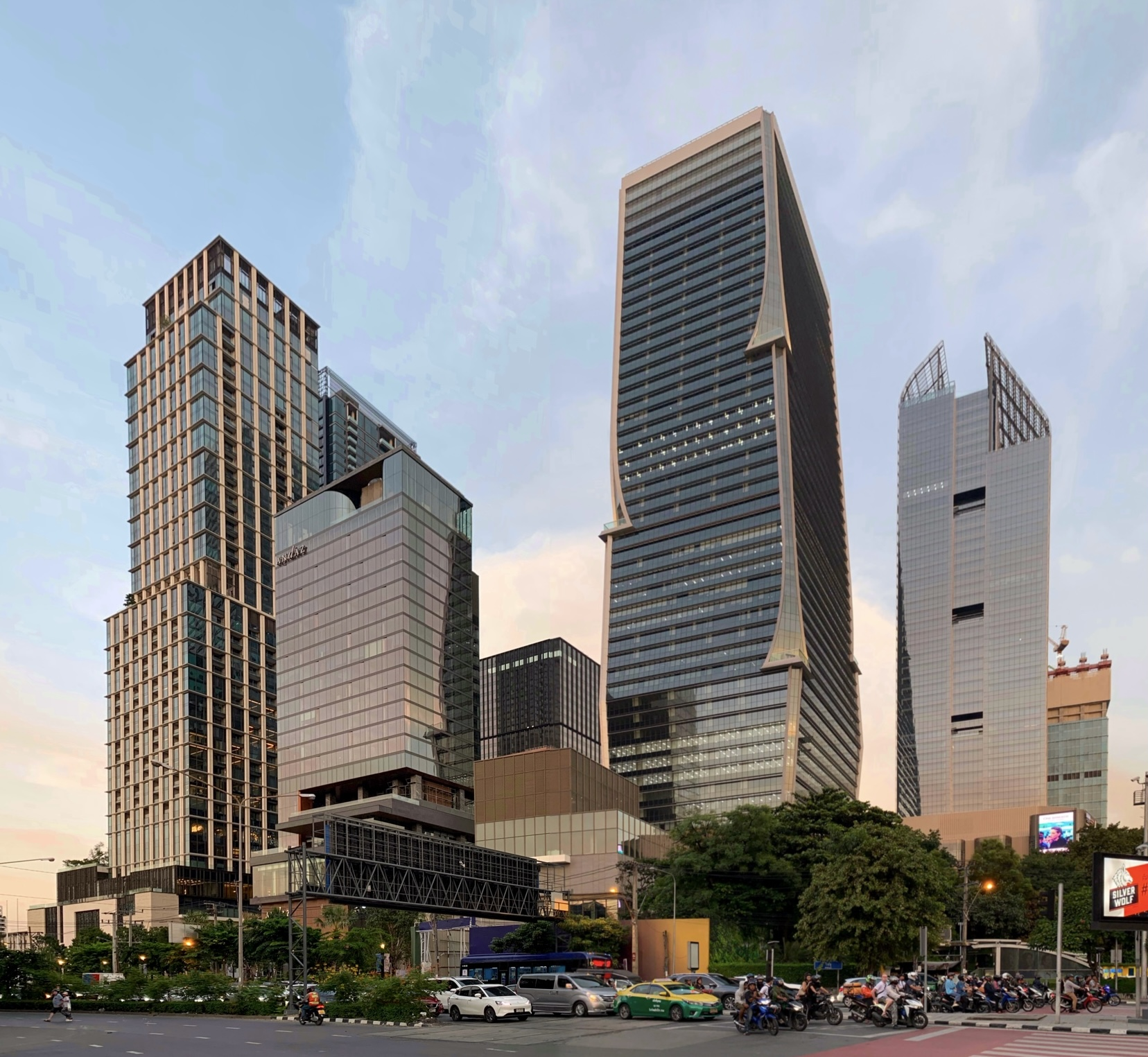
- One Bangkok overview as seen from Witthayu intersection (Where Witthayu, Rama IV and Sathon roads meet) in October 2024
- Interactive map of One Bangkok
- Other name: วัน แบงค็อก
- Location: Northeast corner of Witthayu intersection (Where Witthayu, Rama IV and Sathon roads meet), Pathumwan, Bangkok
- Status: Under construction, partially completed
- Groundbreaking: June 2019
- Estimated completion: 2030-2031
- Use: Mixed use: offices, residential condominiums, hotels, retail
- Website: https://www.onebangkok.com/

Companies
- Architect: Skidmore, Owings & Merrill, A49, Kohn Pedersen Fox Associates, Lead8
- Structural engineer: Beca Group
- Contractor: Thai Bauer & Seafco (foundation works); Thai Obayashi; Nantawan Co.Ltd; Italian-Thai Development; Thai Takenaka; Pre-Built PCL; Visavapat Co.Ltd; Koranit Construction Co.Ltd; T.T.S. Engineering (2004) Co.Ltd.
- Developer: Frasers Property, TCC Assets
- Owner: Charoen Sirivadhanabhakdi

Technical details
- Cost: $USD3.9 Billion
- Buildings: O4H4 (Signature Tower), O3, O2, O1B, O1AH1, H3C3A, C5, C3B, P5, H2A, H2B, R1, R2, R3, R4
- Size: 16.64 hectares
- Leasable area: 1.83 million square metres

One Bangkok (Thai: วัน แบงค็อก) is a US$3.9 billion mixed-use development under construction in Bangkok, Thailand. One Bangkok is being developed by Frasers Property, a subsidiary of TCC Group, one of Thailand's largest conglomerates. It was expected to open in stages between 2024 and 2030 but due to delays has commenced opening on 18 March 2024 starting with the first office building and other elements expected to open during 2024 onwards.

The One Bangkok site occupies an area of 16.7 hectares (41 acres) overlooking Lumphini Park at the corner of Witthayu intersection (Where Witthayu, Rama IV and Sathon roads meet) in Pathum Wan district. The site was previously Suan Lum Night Bazaar and encompasses the old Lumpinee Boxing Stadium and the old Armed Forces Academies Preparatory School.

The development comprises five office towers, three hotels/service apartment towers, interconnected retail podiums, art and cultural venues, with 8 hectares of plazas and landscaped green spaces. The project incorporated many sustainability design features such as a centralized energy and water management system, and the use of recycled waste building materials in construction. It is the first project in Thailand to target a LEED Platinum for neighborhood development. The development is directly linked to Lumphini station of the MRT Blue Line via an underground tunnel with the exit 1B.

One Bangkok is the first real estate project in Thailand to receive both Platinum certifications for WiredScore and SmartScore, marking the highest level of recognition from WiredScore for its commercial office towers.

Among the prominent firms that have chosen to establish their offices at One Bangkok are Baker McKenzie Ltd., KGI Securities (Thailand) Public Company Limited, Estee Lauder Companies, A. Menarini (Thailand) Ltd., LINE MAN Wongnai, BMW Group Thailand, and Microsoft.

One Bangkok Forum hosted the inaugural Eurovision Song Contest Asia on November 14, 2026.

== Development zones and buildings ==
One Bangkok is planned as an integrated district that will accommodate a living and working population of 60,000, and up to 200,000 daily visitors.

The project includes five Grade-A office towers ranging between 40 and 92 storeys, three luxury hotels and service apartment towers and four retail precincts with a combined gross floor area of 1.83 million square meters. The retail precinct will accommodate 450 stores with 180,000 square meters of net lettable area.

Two hotels are currently announced for One Bangkok: The Ritz-Carlton Bangkok, occupying the first 25 floors of one 50-storey tower, and Andaz One Bangkok, occupying the adjacent hotel tower. Both hotels are slated to open at the end of 2024.

The tallest building was originally planned within the complex to be the 92-storey Signature Tower, which at 436 metres (1,430 feet) in height would become Bangkok's and Thailand's tallest building upon completion. As of 2024, construction of the superstructure works of the signature tower and one residential tower does not appear to have started, much of the rest of the development is now topped off or close to complete with the first office building opening to the public in March 2024.

== Gallery ==
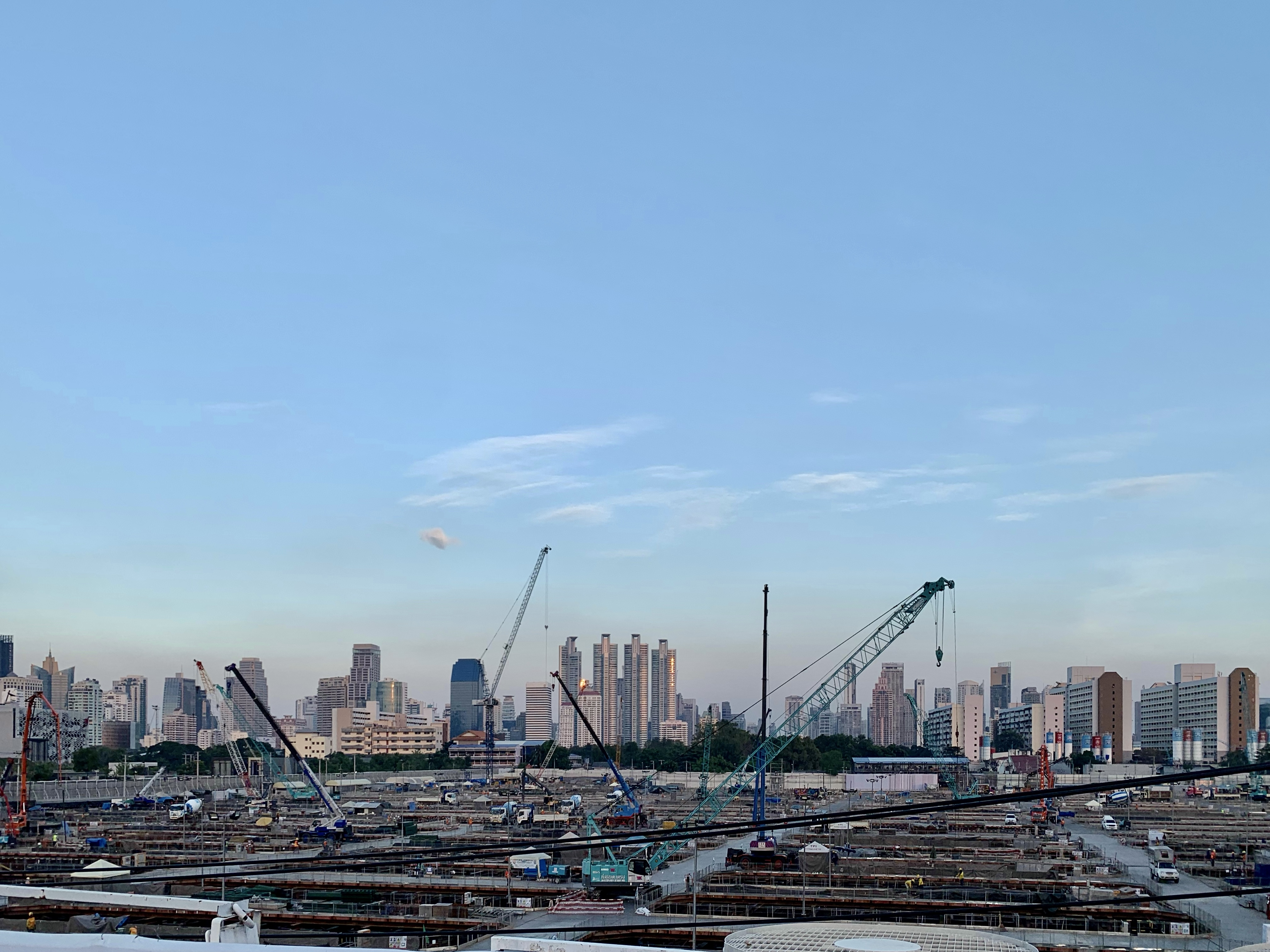
Groundworks of One Bangkok in 2020

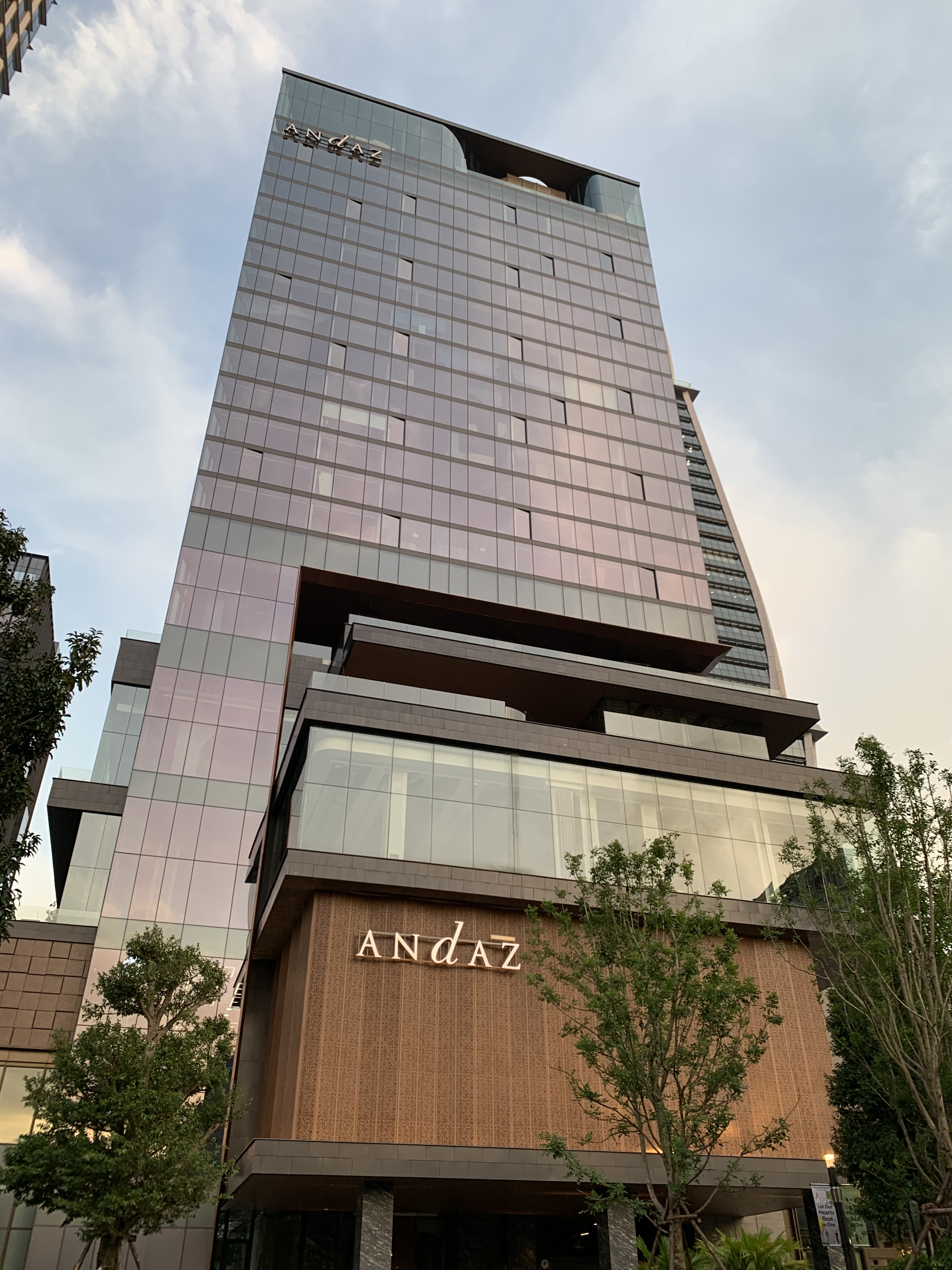
Andaz One Bangkok

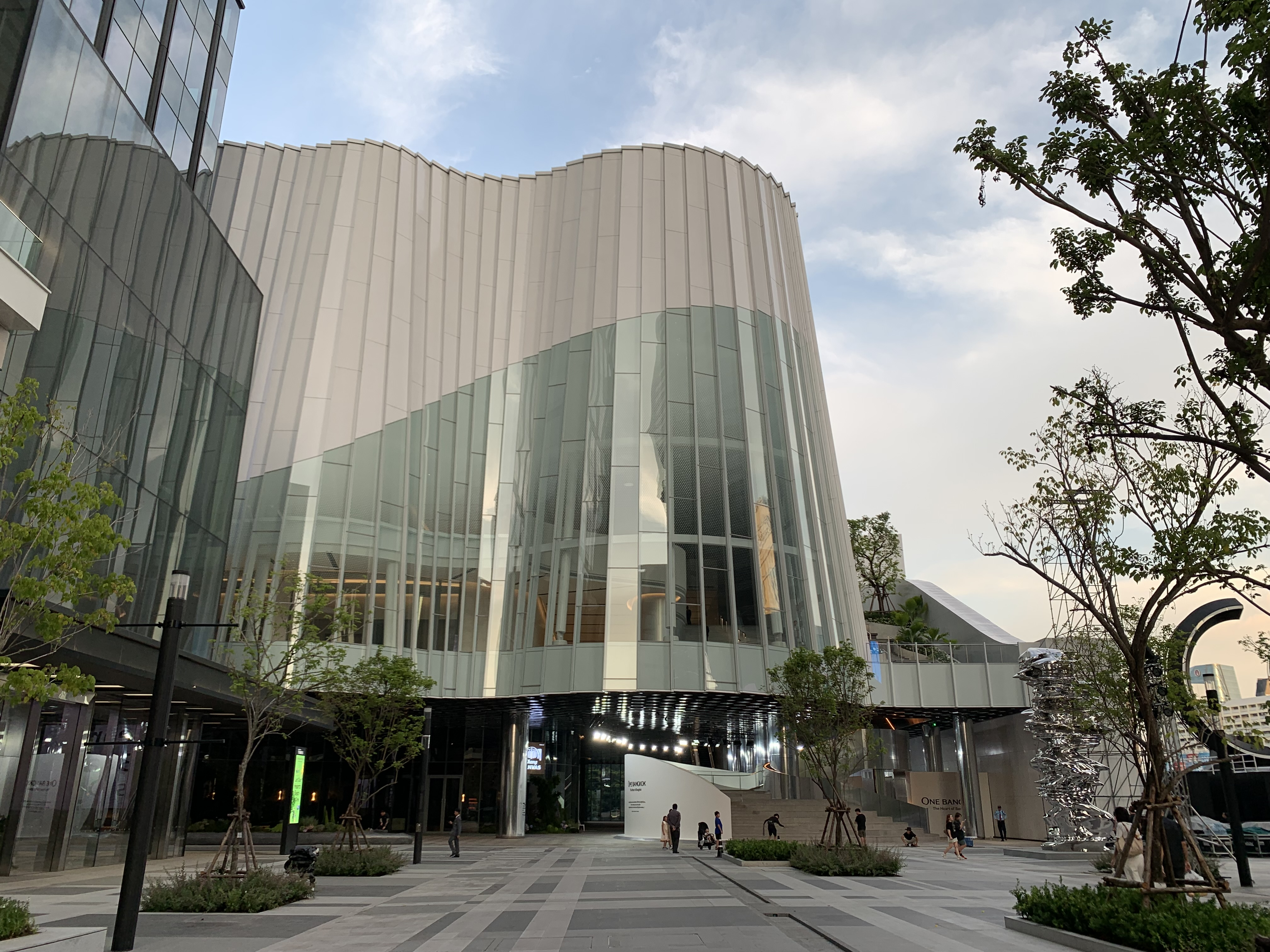
One Bangkok Forum

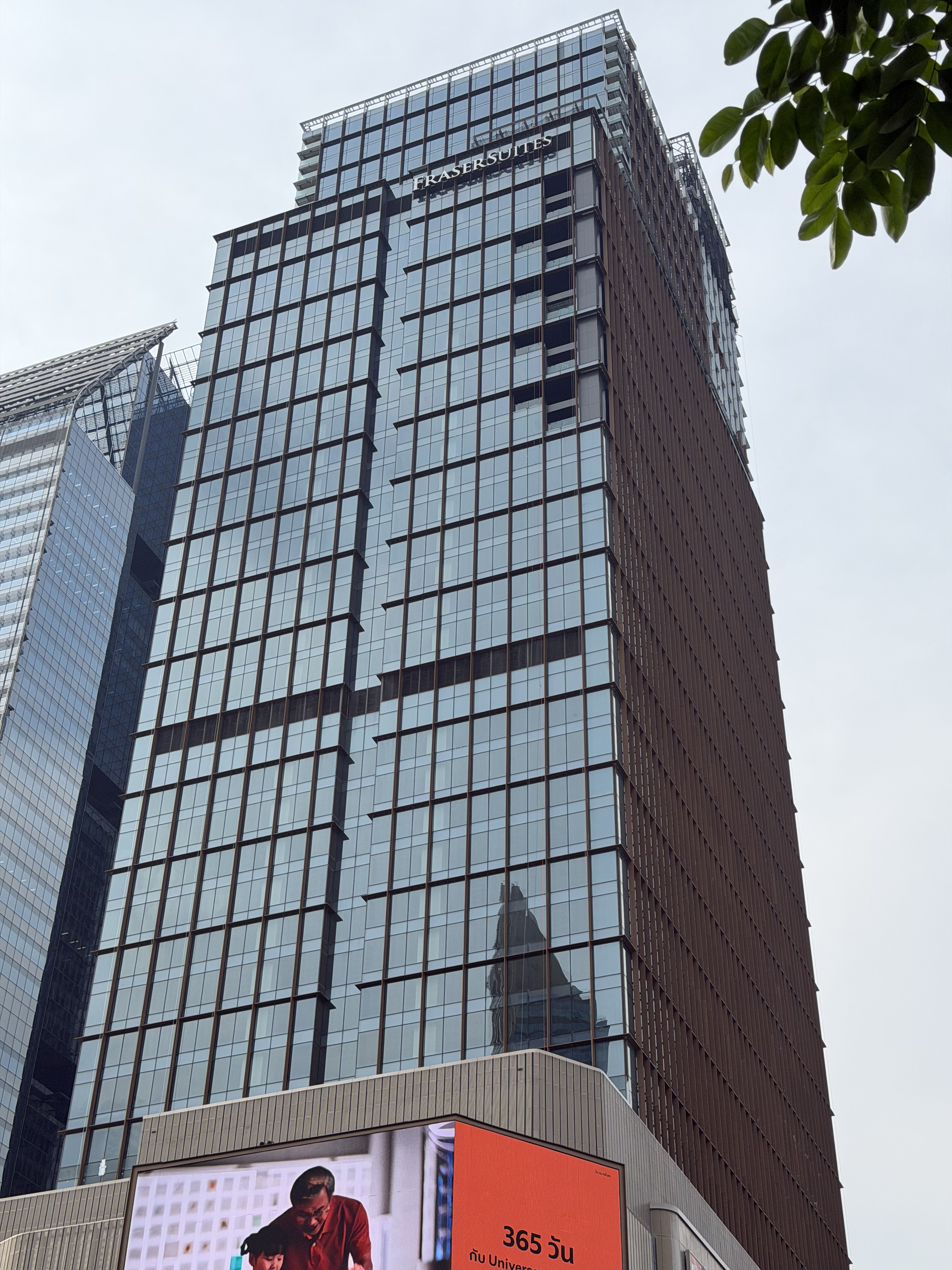
One Bangkok Tower 2 and Frasers Suite Bangkok Hotel

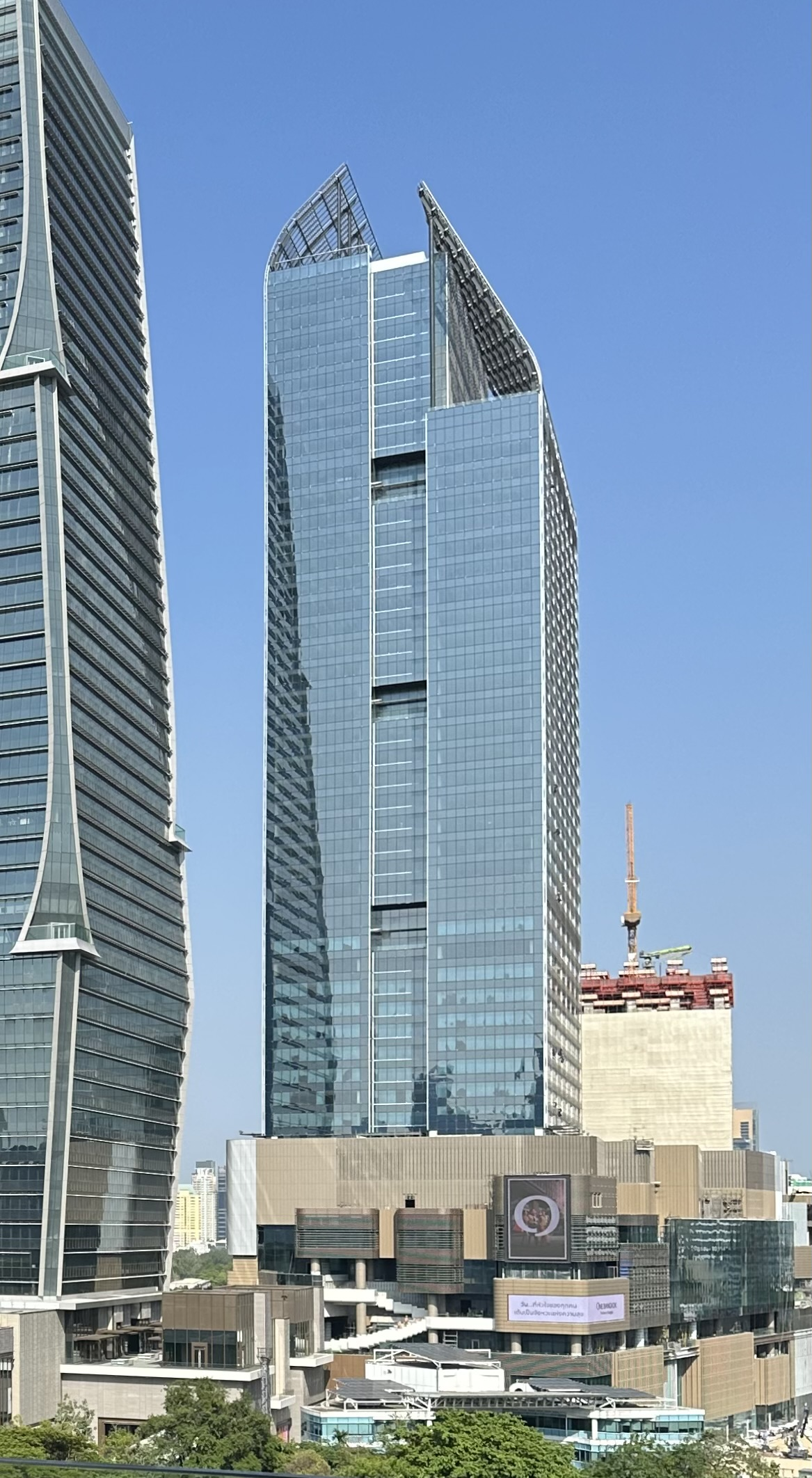
One Bangkok Tower 3

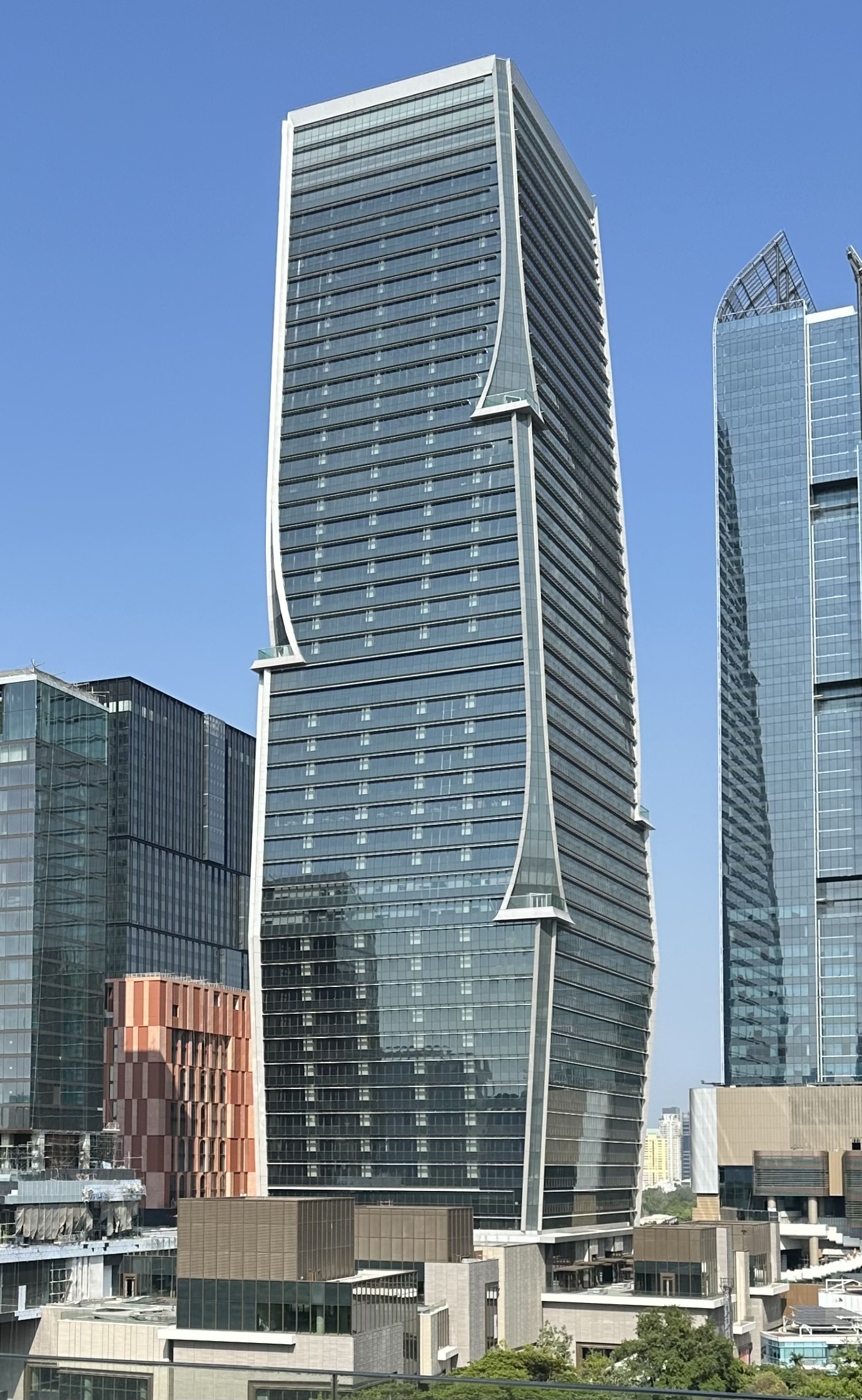
One Bangkok Tower 4

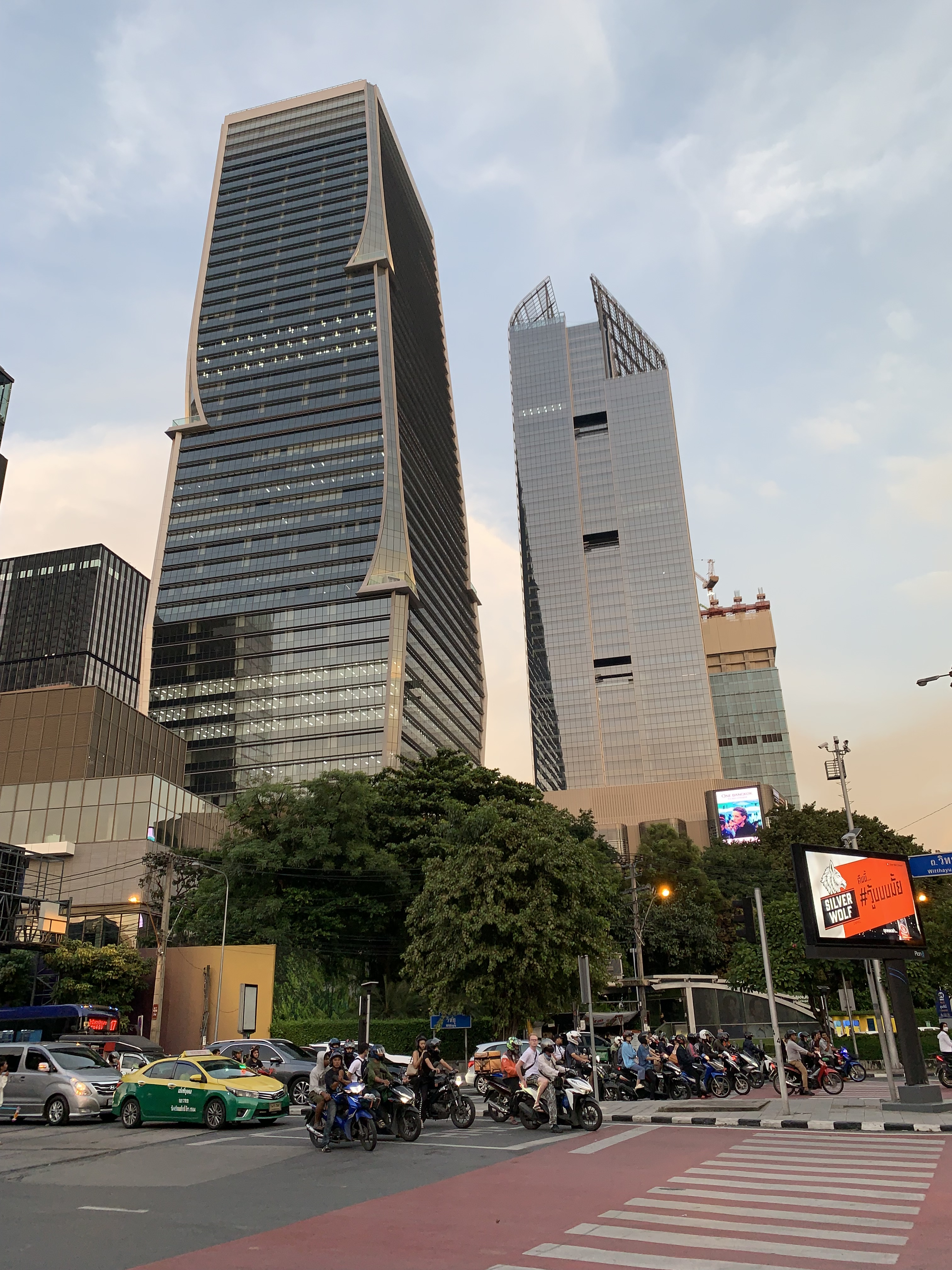
One Bangkok Towers 4 and 3 (left and right)

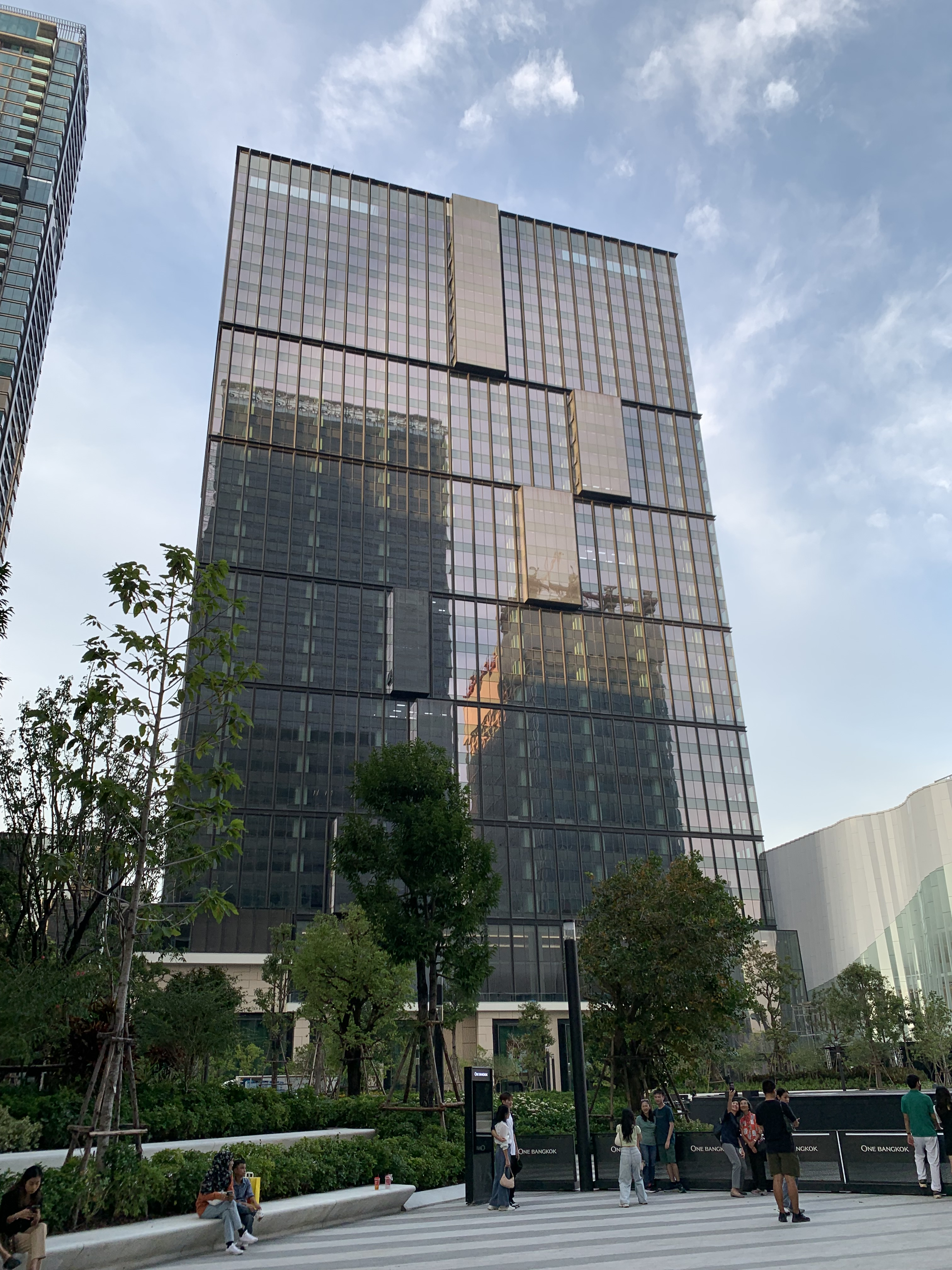
One Bangkok Tower 5

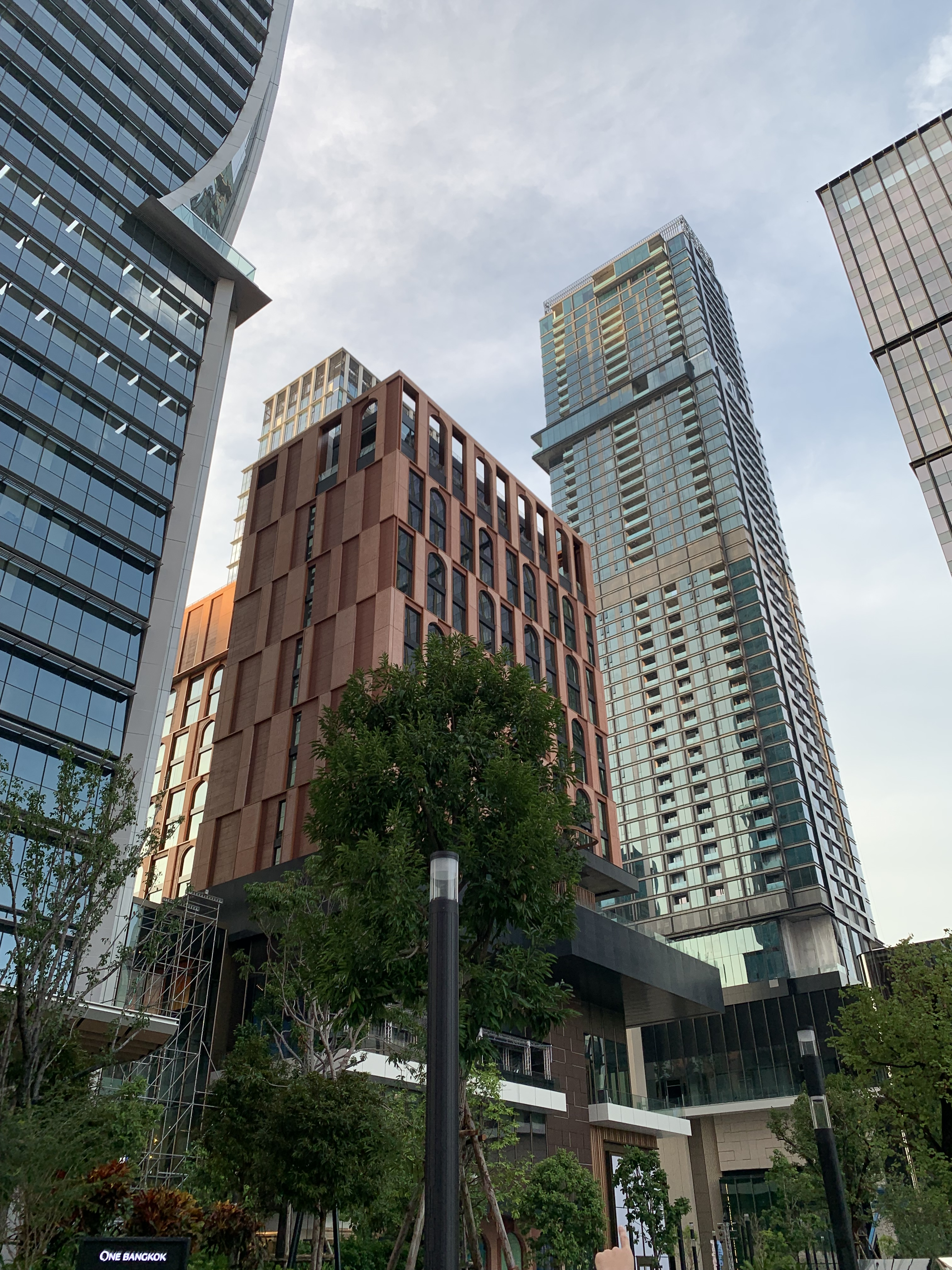
Pathom House

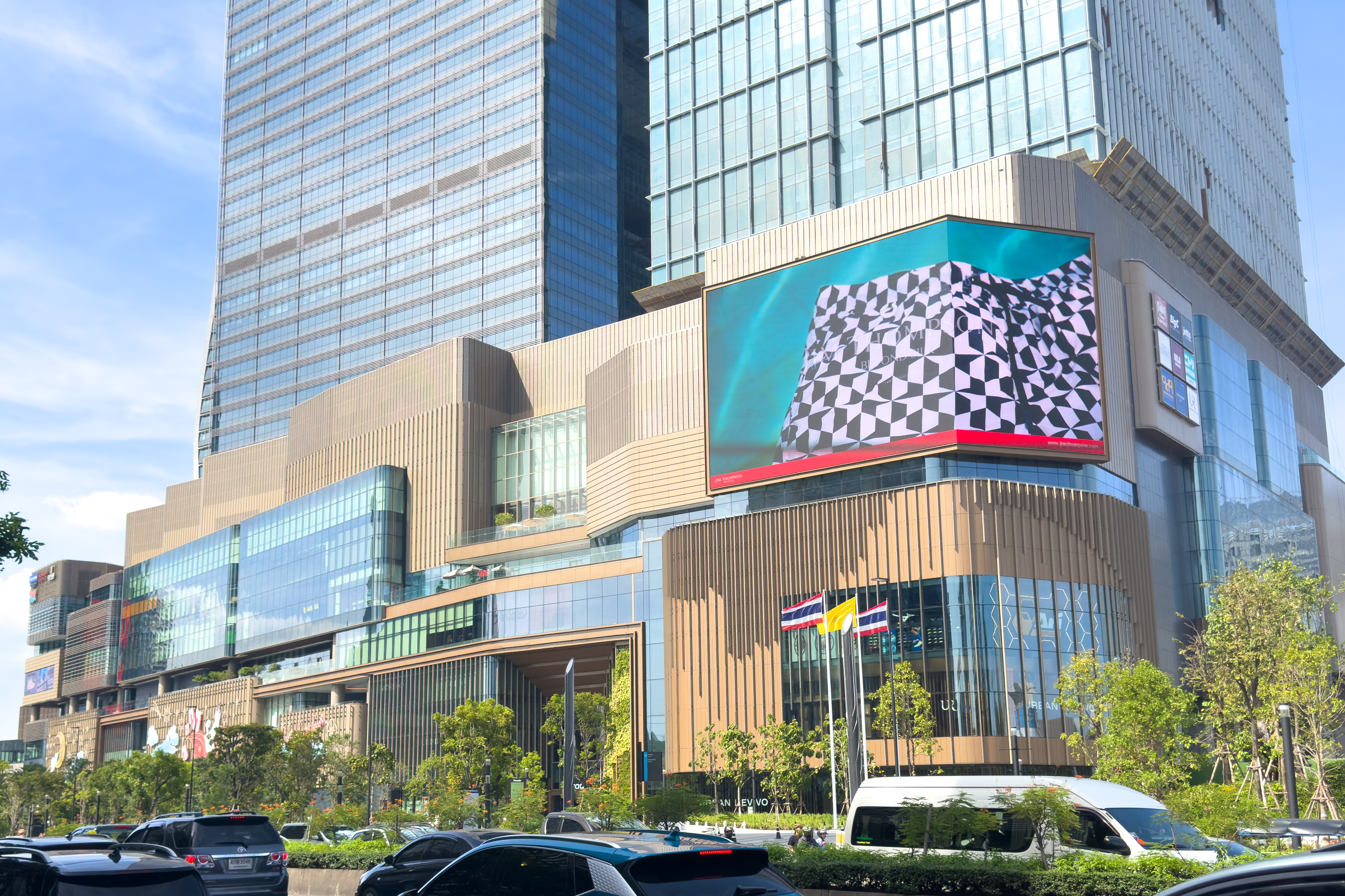
Parade Mall

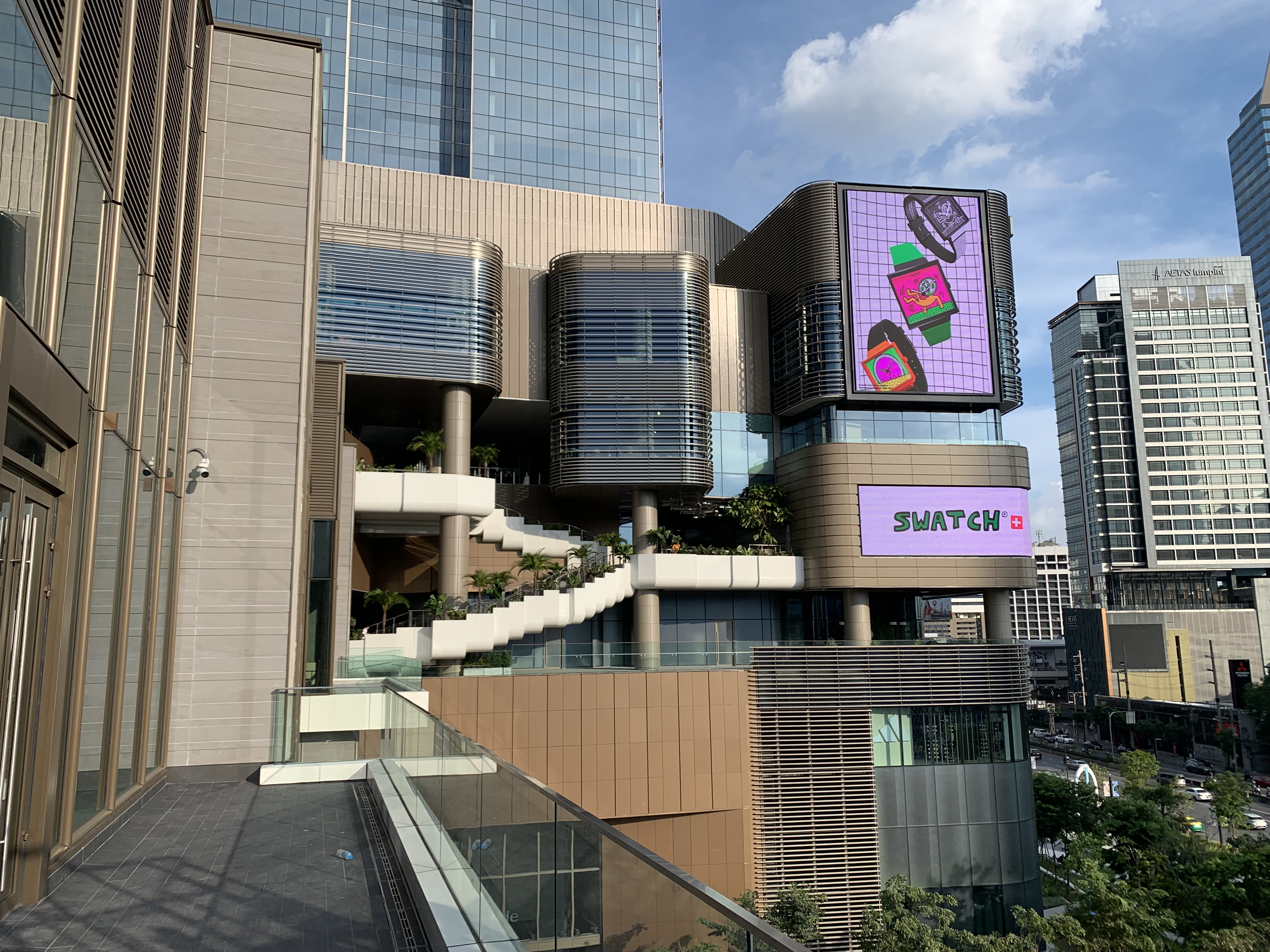
Billboards on Parade retail building

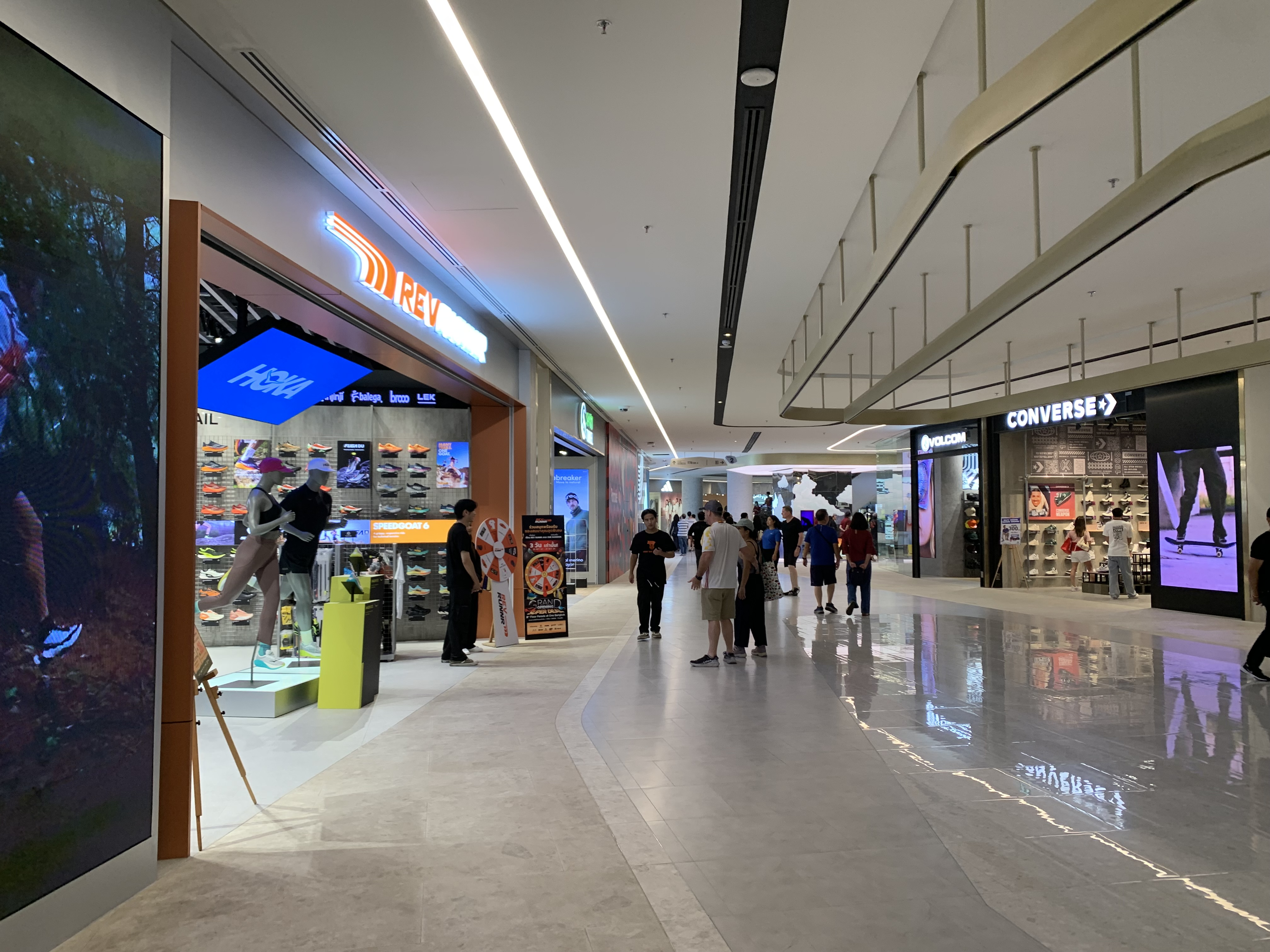
Shops in Parade

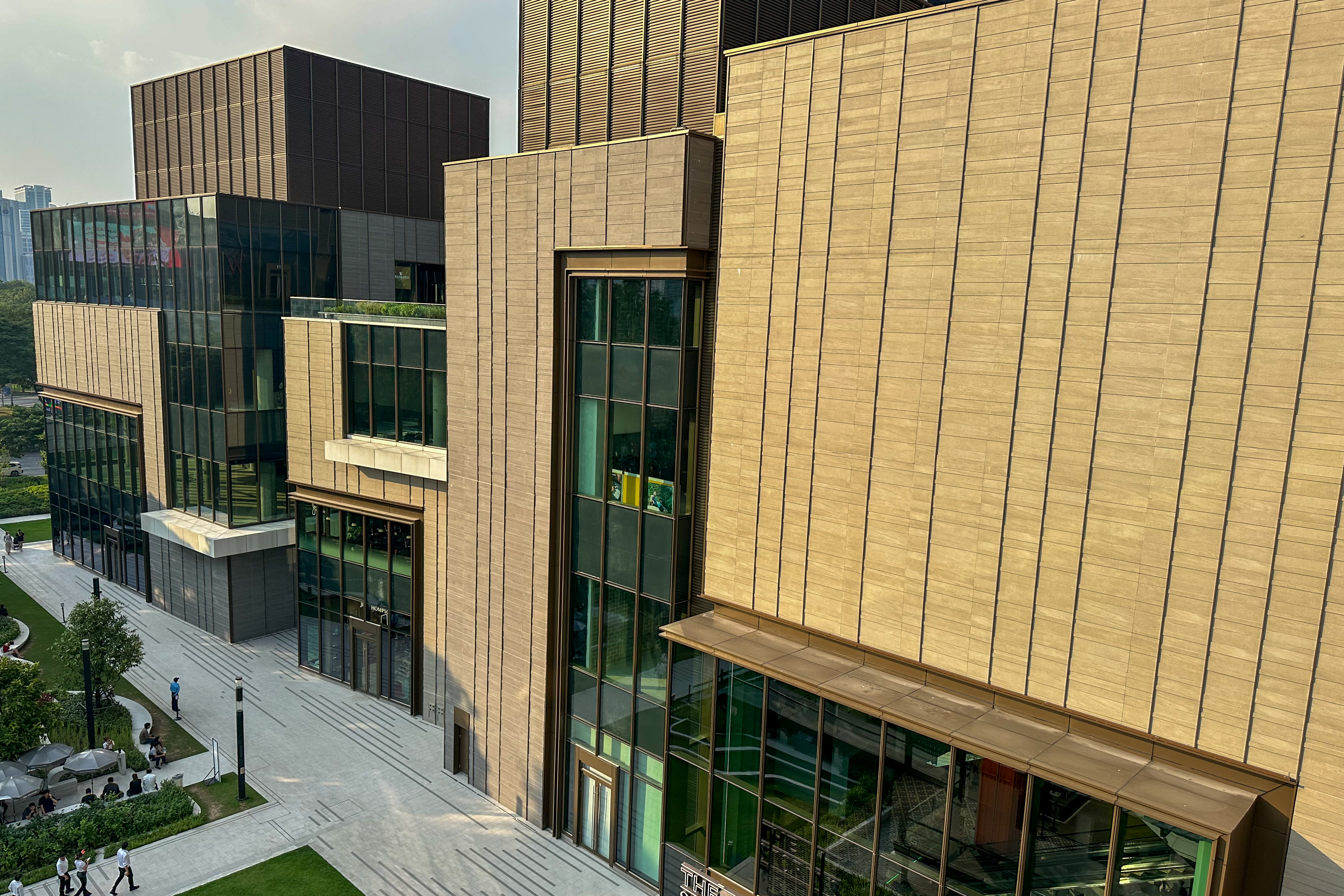
The Storeys Mall

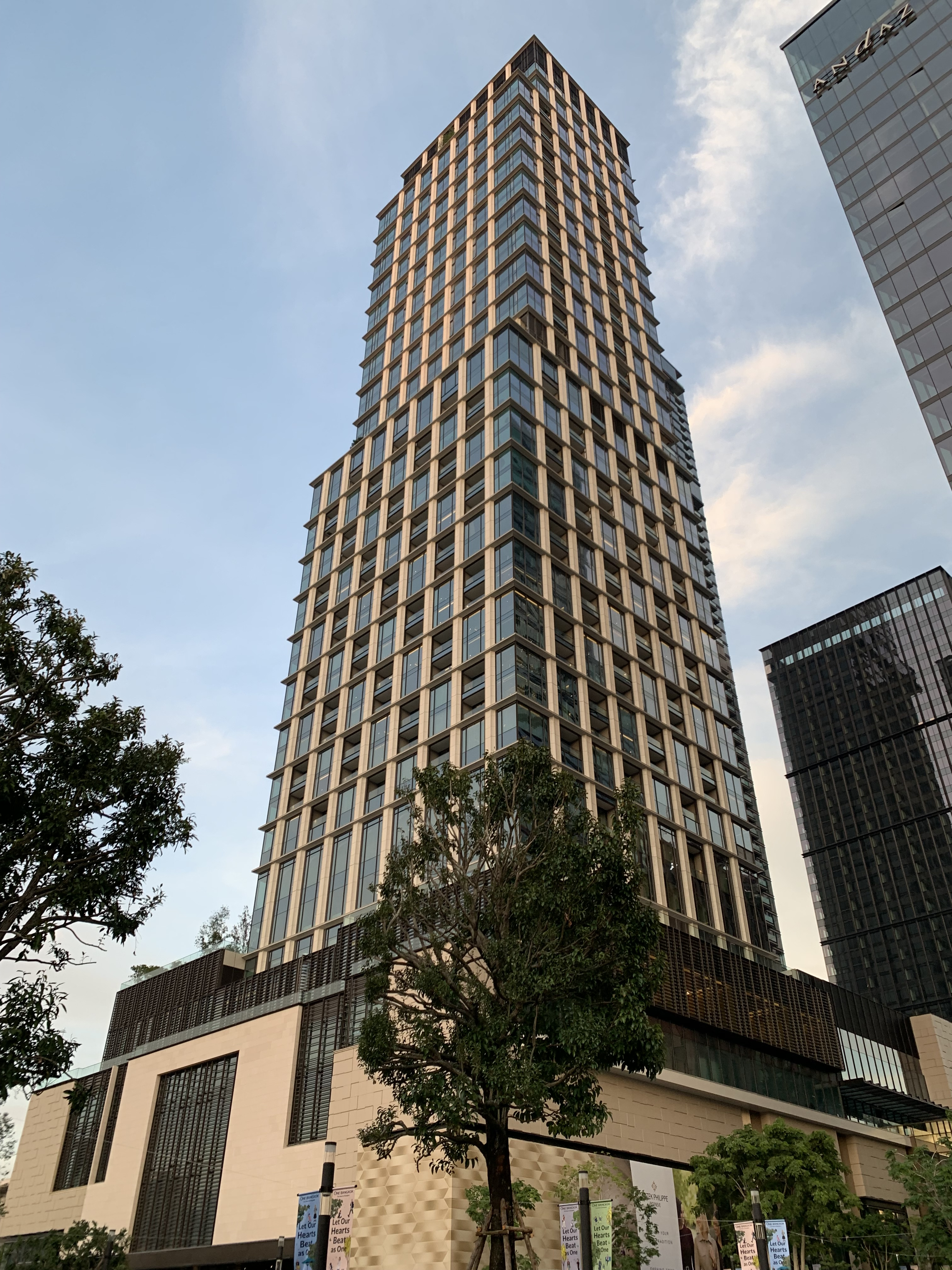
ONE89 Wireless

== See also ==
- Dusit Central Park
- The Central Phaholyothin
