= Thapana Sirivadhanabhakdi =

Thai businessman

- ฐาปน สิริวัฒนภักดี 苏华荣
- Sirivadhanabhakdi in 2020
- Born: January 1975 (age 51); Bangkok, Thailand
- Education: Boston University
- Occupation: businessman
- Title: CEO and president, ThaiBev
- Term: 2008-
- Spouse: Papatchya Thienprasiddhi
- Parent(s): Charoen Sirivadhanabhakdi; Khunying Wanna

Thapana Sirivadhanabhakdi (Thai: ฐาปน สิริวัฒนภักดี; Chinese: 苏华荣; pinyin: Sū Huáróng; born 1975) is a Thai businessman and the CEO and president of ThaiBev since 2008.

== Early life ==
He is the third of five children of the Thai Chinese billionaire Charoen Sirivadhanabhakdi (Su Xuming), the founder and chairman of ThaiBev. His Chinese family name is Su (simplified Chinese: 苏; traditional Chinese: 蘇), and "Sirivadhanabhakdi" is the Thai surname granted by King Bhumibol of Thailand to his father in 1988.

Thapana finished his secondary school Assumption College, Bangkok and earned a bachelor's degree in finance and a master's degree in financial economics, both from Boston University.

== Career ==
In January 2008, Thapana was appointed the CEO and president of ThaiBev, having served five years as a director and executive vice president of the company.

Thapana has management roles or directorships in Berli Jucker, Beer Thai, Red Bull Distillery Group, Dhospaak, Oishi Group, Oishi Group Public Co Ltd, Univentures PLC, Siam Food Products PLC, and the Southeast Group of Companies.

== Personal life ==
Thapana is married to the former Papatchya Thienprasiddhi. She is the daughter of Pracha and Prajittra Thienprasiddhi. She manages the family-owned Thienprasiddhi Kindergarten.
