= ThaiBev =

Thai beverage company

Thai Beverage
- Type: Public
- Traded as: SGX: Y92
- Industry: Beverage
- Founded: 29 October 2003; 22 years ago
- Founder: Charoen Sirivadhanabhakdi
- Headquarters: Bangkok, Thailand
- Area served: Worldwide
- Key people: Thapana Sirivadhanabhakdi (President & CEO)
- Brands: Chang, Archa, Federbräu
- Revenue: ▲340.29 billion baht (2024)
- Net income: ▲35.27 billion baht (2024)
- Total assets: ▼527.59 billion baht (2024)
- Subsidiaries: Fraser and Neave; Sermsuk; Oishi Group; InterBev Group; Inver House Distillers; Sabeco Brewery
- Website: www.thaibev.com

Thai Beverage Public Company Limited (Thai: บริษัท ไทยเบฟเวอเรจ จำกัด (มหาชน)), better known as ThaiBev (Thai: ไทยเบฟ) (SGX: Y92 ), is Thailand's largest and one of Southeast Asia's largest beverage companies, with distilleries in Thailand, UK, and China. It is owned by Thai Chinese billionaire business magnate Charoen Sirivadhanabhakdi. Listed on the Singapore Stock Exchange, Thai Beverage plc has a market capitalization in excess of US$13 billion.

In 2004, the firm announced it had succeeded in a US$11.2 billion deal to take over the conglomerate Fraser and Neave, adding to the group's portfolio of assets.

== History ==
ThaiBev was founded on 29 October 2003 with the consolidation of 58 beer and spirits businesses, among them Chang beer, second in the beer market after Singha. ThaiBev brands include green-tea beverage Oishi and Est, a cola. The Sirivadhanabhakdi family's stake in Thai Beverage is around 30%. Charoen is chairman and his son Thapana serves as president and CEO. Thai Beverage is listed on the Singapore stock exchange as the Stock Exchange of Thailand (SET) prohibits the listing of alcohol-related stocks.

== Overview ==
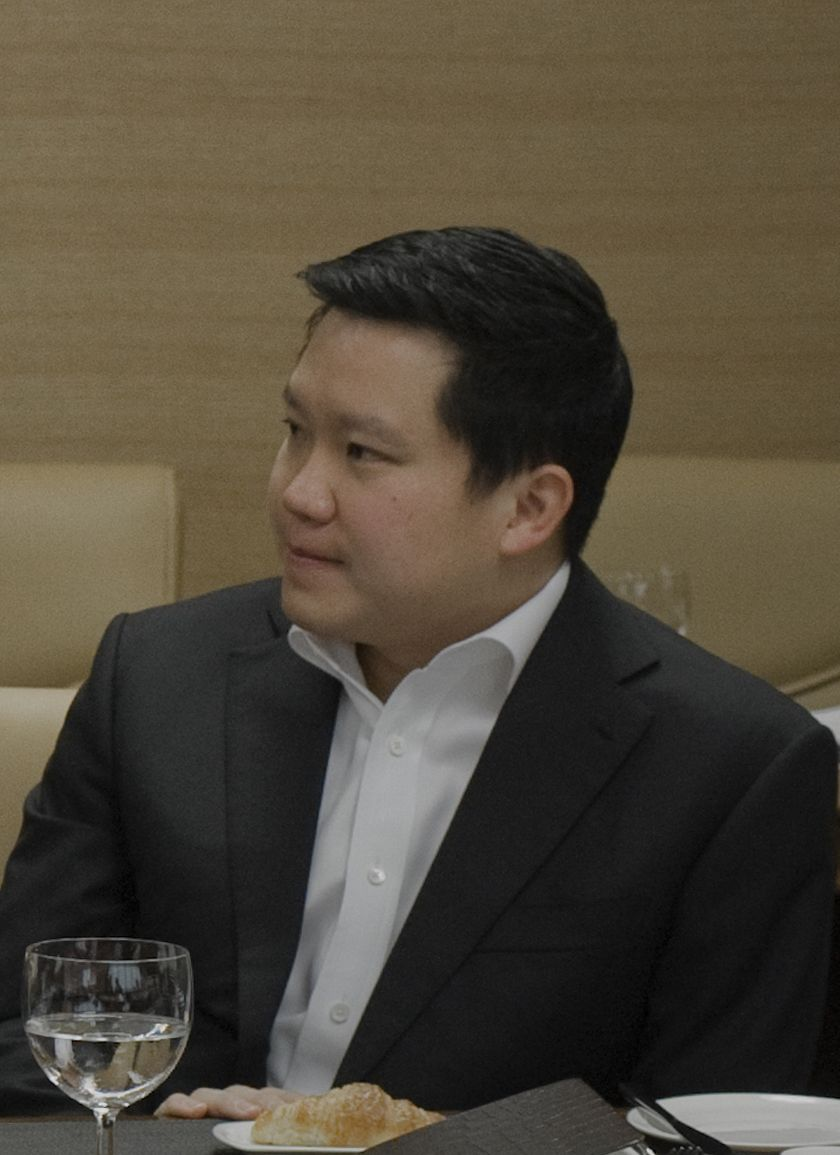
Thapana Sirivadhanabhakdi, president and CEO

Thai Beverage Public Company Limited owns and distributes several significant brands, including Chang beer, Mekhong, and SangSom rum. It has significant operations in Europe, producing malt Scotch whisky, vodka, gin, and liqueurs at five distilleries in Scotland, UK.

Charoen Sirivadhanabhakdi, in early 2013, added Fraser and Neave, Limited, a food and beverage, brewing, property, and publishing industries conglomerate in Singapore, to his drinks and property empire.

Chang Beer, which started production in March 1995 at a brewery in the Bang Ban District of Ayutthaya Province, is the top-selling brand in Thailand. It managed to win 60% market share in Thailand after a hard market fight with the previous leading brand, Singha. In 2006, the company's beer market share was 49%, according to research company Canadean.

== Beer ==
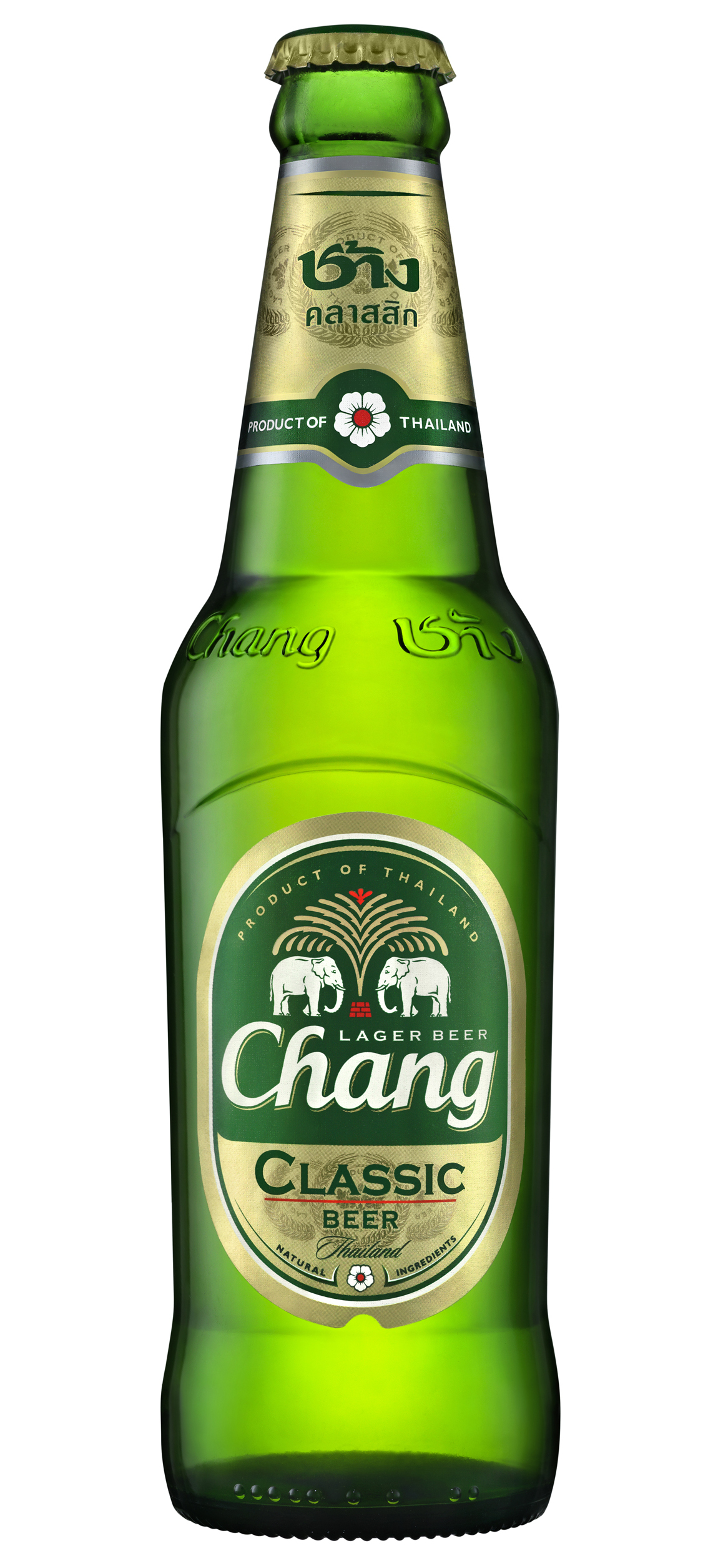
New Chang Classic beer from 2015

=== Chang ===
ThaiBev brews Chang (or Chang Beer) (Thai: เบียร์ช้าง biā Cháāng), a pale lager. "Chang" (Thai: ช้าง cháāng) is the Thai word for elephant, an animal of cultural and historical significance in Thailand. The logo depicts two elephants face-to-face. In 2006, the company launched Chang Light, 4.2% ABV and Chang Draught in bottles at 5% ABV. They were discontinued in 2015.

In 2015, ThaiBev celebrated its 20th anniversary Chang Beer. For this occasion, ThaiBev consolidated all Chang brands in Chang Classic. ThaiBev stopped production of Chang Light, Chang Draught, and Chang Export. In addition, the new bottle was introduced in emerald green. Production of Chang Classic is shared between ThaiBev's three breweries. The recipe was changed to include rice, previously only used in the domestic 6.4% version. Its ABV in Thailand is 4.8% (Accurate as of August 2024).

ThaiBev's flagship brand Chang Beer won a gold quality award three times in the beers, water, and soft drinks category at the World Quality Selections 2018, organized each year by Monde Selection.

=== Archa ===
In 2004, the company introduced Archa (Thai: อาชา ā-chā poetic term for 'horse') beer, at 5.4% ABV. Archa won a gold medal at the 2007 Australian International Beer Awards (AIBA). The ABV was lowered to 5% in 2014. The first market outside Thailand to distribute Archa Beer was Singapore, where it was successfully launched in 2012 by InterBev (Singapore) Ltd.

=== Federbräu ===
Federbräu is a German-inspired quality beer brewed using imported German malt, using only a single source of malt in the brewing process. Federbräu is 5% alcohol by volume.

=== Chang/Carlsberg ===
In December 2000, Carlsberg and Chang established a 50–50 joint venture, Carlsberg Asia, to create a significant brewing company in Asia. The Carlsberg influence can be seen in the typography of the "Beer Chang" logo, which resembles the classic "Carlsberg Beer". In 2005, Carlsberg pulled out of the venture and terminated its licence agreement with Chang due to non-fulfillment of contractual obligations, resulting in Chang claiming US$2.5 billion in damages. A final settlement of US$120 million was subsequently paid by Carlsberg.

=== Saigon and 333 ===
ThaiBev bought a majority of shares in Sabeco in 2018 for US$4.8 billion. Sabeco owns leading beer brands in Vietnam including Saigon Beer and 333. At the time of the acquisition, Sabeco's Vietnam market share had fallen below 40%.

=== Oyoshi vs Oyoshi Cambodia confusion ===
In 2026, Oishi, a popular green tea brand under Thaibev's Fraser & Neave limited was commonly confused with independent local Cambodian green tea brand with the same name - Oyoshi by FN Beverage Co Ltd, with its trademark registered in Singapore & manufacturing remaining and business registration remaining in Cambodia according to WIPO. Meanwhile, F&N sdn Bhd retains the Malaysian trademark.

== Spirits ==
ThaiBev produces brown and white spirits, including rum.

ThaiBev's most famous, but not best selling, spirit is Mekhong, which originated in 1941 at the Bangyikhan Distillery west of Bangkok. Originally a state-owned distillery, it dates back over 200 years to the beginning of the current Chakri dynasty. The launch of Mekhong (a rum with added rice) was aimed at producing a high-quality Thai spirit to stem the increase in the import of foreign liquor and to eventually replace imported brands. SangSom (rum), however, has been the country's most popular spirit brand for over 29 years, until 2006 holding almost 50% share of the entire brown spirits market in Thailand. The company also produces Mungkorn Thong and Hong Thong and brands based on whisky, such as Blend 285, Crown 99 and Blue, Meridian a brand of V.S.O.P. brandy, as well as Scotch whisky brands such as Hankey Banister and Pinwinnie Royal Scotch Whisky.

White spirits are made from molasses without any mixture or colour, and produced in four alcohol contents: 28, 30, 35 and 40%. The company's largest-selling white spirits is Ruang Khao. The labels are colour-coded to reflect the alcoholic strength but do not have the brand name printed on them. Other brands in this category are Niyomthai and White Tiger.

=== Production ===
Molasses are the main raw material used for the production of ThaiBev's spirits, so that most of the products fall under the category of rum. As is the case with all distilled spirits, the distillate is crystal clear when first distilled. Amber and dark brown spirits obtain their colour from the extracts from the oak barrel during aging and from caramel, a natural coloring agent.

ThaiBev's yeast cultures, used for fermentation, are grown in its own laboratory and propagated in a yeast propagation tank. The yeast, molasses diluted by water, steamed rice that has been sprayed with mould (to create sugar) and incubated for four days, and water are added into a fermenter and the mixture is allowed to ferment for approximately 72 hours. The liquid that is left at the end of the fermentation process is known as fermented mash.

Distillation takes place in a distilling column and a pot still, which is a large copper or stainless steel kettle. Distilling involves boiling the "fermented mash" and condensing its vapour. The spent sludge remaining in the pot still is removed to be processed. The company's white spirits are then diluted with demineralized water to the desired alcohol content in a white spirits blending tank and sent to be packaged and bottled after filtering.

Brown spirits are diluted with demineralized water and then aged in oak barrels for three to eight years depending on the brand. The aged alcohol is then further diluted with demineralized water before bottling. Liquor concentrate alcohol and caramel colour are added. The brown spirits are passed through filters and then bottled and packaged. ThaiBev also makes Chinese herb spirits, branded as Chiang-Chun and Sua Dum. These are produced by blending alcohol, white spirits, sugar, caramel and Chinese herbs, and then further diluting the mixture with demineralized water.

== Corporate affairs ==
=== Sponsorships ===
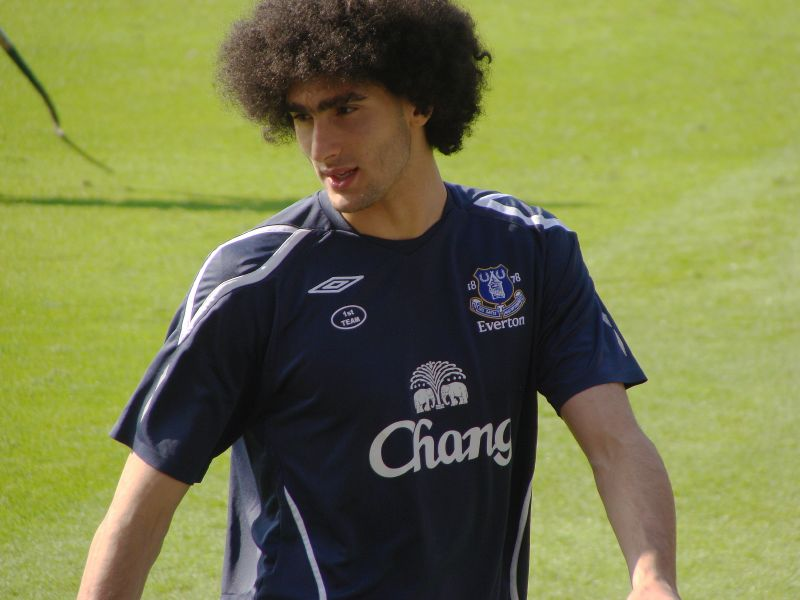
Chang become sponsor of Everton FC

In 2004, Chang became the sponsor of Everton Football Club of the English Premier League. Together, they initiated five projects in the aftermath of the tsunami disaster in Thailand.

Following the 2004 tsunami that struck the Khao Lak coast in Phang Nga Province of Thailand and destroyed the village of Ban Nam Khem, ThaiBev and Everton sponsored the construction of 50 houses and a football field there, in a project dubbed Everton-Chang. Local youth teams compete for the Chang-Everton cup. Officials from Everton F.C. and Chang Beer have been involved in the project. Together, they sponsor Chang Everton Football Cup and send promising Thai footballers to Liverpool for a trial with Everton.

Chang also notably became the sponsor of some of the local football team playing in the Thai League 1 and Thai League 2 division.

==== Current sponsorship ====
- (Thailand) Chonburi F.C. (2008–present)
- (Thailand) Nakhon Pathom United F.C. (2009–present)
- (Thailand) Sukhothai F.C. (2010–present)
- (Thailand) Buriram United F.C. (2011–present)
- (Thailand) Suphanburi F.C. (2013–present)
- (Thailand) Police Tero F.C. (2017–present)
- (Thailand) Navy F.C. (2017–present)
- (Thailand) Trat F.C. (2017–present)
- (Thailand) Ayutthaya United F.C. (2017–present)
- (Thailand) Lamphun Warriors F.C. (2022–present)
- (Thailand) Ratchaburi F.C. (2023–present)

==== Former sponsorship ====
- (England) Everton F.C. (2004–2017)
- (Thailand) Army United F.C. (2012–2019)
- (Thailand) Udon Thani F.C. (2021–2022)
- (Thailand) Samut Prakan City F.C. (2023–2025)

== Criticism and protest ==
In 2005, ThaiBev became the subject of nationwide criticism in Thailand by the Buddhist monastic community and other religious groups. At the time, Thai Beverage had announced its intent to list publicly on the Stock Exchange of Thailand (SET), which would be the biggest listing in Thai history. Despite attempts by the National Office of Buddhism (a government agency) to prohibit monks from protesting, 2,000 monks from Wat Phra Dhammakaya organized chants of Buddhist texts in front of the Stock Exchange to halt Thai Beverage's IPO. (Note: The temple used the project name "Thai Buddhist Monks National Coordination Center".) In an unprecedented cooperative effort, the temple was joined by former Black May revolt leader Chamlong Srimuang and the Santi Asoke movement. Subsequently, another 122 religious and social organizations joined the opposition, reaching numbers of 10,000 protesters. The organizations asked Prime Minister Thaksin Shinawatra's cooperation to stop the company, in what some of the protest leaders described as "a grave threat to the health and culture" of Thai society. While SET pointed out the economic benefits of the listing, opponents referred to rising alcohol abuse in Thai society, ranking fifth in alcohol consumption according to the UN Food and Agriculture Organization. Ultimately, the protests led to an indefinite postponement of the listing by the exchange. Thai Beverage chose to list in Singapore instead, as the Thai Stock Exchange chief resigned as a result.

== See also ==
- List of Thais by net worth
- Thai Chinese
