= Charoen Sirivadhanabhakdi =

Thai businessman (born 1944)

Charoen Sirivadhanabhakdi MPCh MVM PBh ThCh
- เจริญ สิริวัฒนภักดี 苏旭明
- Born: Khiakmeng Saeso (เคียกเม้ง แซ่โซว); 2 May 1944 (age 82); Bangkok, Thailand
- Occupations: Chairman, ThaiBev and Fraser and Neave
- Spouse: Khunying Wanna Sirivadhanabhakdi
- Children: 5, including Thapana Sirivadhanabhakdi and Wallapa Traisorat

Charoen Sirivadhanabhakdi (Thai: เจริญ สิริวัฒนภักดี; simplified Chinese: 苏旭明; traditional Chinese: 蘇旭明; pinyin: Sū Xùmíng; Pe̍h-ūe-jī: Sou Hiok-mêng; RTGS: Charoen Siriwatthanaphakdi; born 2 May 1944) is a Thai business magnate and investor.

He is the founder of Thai Beverage, and the chairman of conglomerates TCC Group and Fraser and Neave, Ltd (F&N). The Sirivadhanabhakdi family is now Thailand's largest property developer and landlord of 630,000 rai (101,000 ha; 250,000 acres), plus commercial and retail buildings in Singapore. He also owns 50 hotels in Asia, the US, UK, and Australia, including Plaza Athénée in Manhattan, New York City, US, and The Okura Prestige Bangkok. As of 2020, Forbes estimates his net worth at US$10.5 billion.

In 1988, King Bhumibol of Thailand granted the family the Thai surname "Sirivadhanabhakdi".

== Early life ==
Born to a Thai Chinese family in 1944, Charoen is the sixth of eleven children of a poor street vendor who migrated to Bangkok from Shantou. His Chinese name is Su Xuming (simplified Chinese: 苏旭明; traditional Chinese: 蘇旭明; pinyin: Sū Xùmíng). Like many other Chinese immigrants, the family later adopted a Thai surname, Srisomburananont. He left school early, at the age of nine, to work. Charoen speaks Teochew, his native Chinese dialect, as well as Thai.

== Business career ==
Charoen started by supplying distilleries producing Thai whiskey, which were a state-run monopoly at the time. Through the contacts he made, he acquired a licence to produce his own alcoholic drinks. All liquor production was state-owned at the time, and Charoen was able to get rights to 15 percent of the market.

In 1985, the remaining 85 percent of state licences were opened to bids. Charoen was able to take out a US$200 million loan using his large stocks of alcohol as collateral and soon after won 100 percent of the concessions. With this monopoly, Charoen's beverage companies were able to return US$550 million in royalties to Thailand's excise department in 1987, five percent of the national budget at the time.

=== Beer ===
In 1991, Charoen teamed up with the Danish brewer Carlsberg to tap into Thailand's growing beer market, at the time dominated by the 60-year-old Boon Rawd Brewery which made Singha beer. Three years later, based on what he had learned from Carlsberg, he began making his own beer, branded "Chang" (Thai for 'elephant'). Within five years, Chang had 60 percent of the local market. Largely eclipsed, in 2003 Carlsberg withdrew from the joint venture. Charoen then successfully sued the Danish company, winning US$120 million in 2005. In 2005, an attempt by Siriwattanapakdi to list ThaiBev on the Thai stock market triggered protests from Thai Buddhist groups due to concerns over the dangers of increased consumption of alcohol. The protests from the Buddhists groups managed to stop ThaiBev from being listed on the Thai stock exchange.

=== Property ===
Since the early-2000s, Charoen has successfully been able to branch out into property development through the creation of TCC Land Co. Ltd. The company is now one of the largest property developers in Thailand, investing in and developing residential, hospitality and retail sites, as well as engaging in property management, logistics, agro-business and several property funds in Thailand and Singapore. Since its formal establishment, TCC Land's developments have been primarily focused on Thailand, and indeed the Sirivadhanabhakdi family is now the largest landlord in the country, controlling 630,000 rai of land as of June 2014—over three times more than Thailand's second largest landowner, and approximately 21 times more than that owned by the royal family's Crown Property Bureau. TCC Land also has several overseas properties that are managed by TCC Land International Co., Ltd., including interests in the US, UK, Australia, Japan, the PRC, and several Southeast Asian countries.

In early-2013, Charoen won a bidding war for Singapore's Fraser and Neave, Ltd. which has properties throughout Asia as well as soft-drinks operations, with debt accounting for most of the US$11.2 billion price. He received financing to back the deal, the largest merger-and-acquisition transaction introduced in Asia in 2012, from a group of banks including United Overseas Bank, Ltd of Singapore and DBS Bank, Ltd The total number of F&N shares owned by Charoen's group—TCC Assets and Thai Beverage—amounts to 1.19 billion, representing an approximate 83 percent stake, as of 14 February.

In April 2017, Charoen announced plans for a US$3.5 billion new development, a 104 rai site and the largest private sector property development in Thailand to date, located at the corners of Rama IV and Wireless Road opposite Lumphini Park, called One Bangkok. The development will include offices, retail, residential, hotels, and public space/arts program, jointly developed by TCC Assets and Frasers Property. The 1.83 million m^{2} project is expected to be completed in 2025.

=== Sport ===
In late-2015, rumours emerged that Charoen was close to completing a takeover of English Premier League side Everton, a club which Chang Beer has sponsored since 2004.

=== Retail ===
On 7 February 2016, TCC Group announced that it would buy a controlling 58.6 percent stake in Thai hypermarket operator Big C Supercenter for €3.1 billion from Groupe Casino of France. Big C is Thailand's second-largest hypermarket operator after Tesco's Thai unit, and has a market capitalisation of 163.25 billion baht (US$4.6 billion). Charoen's acquisition of Big C would boost the tycoon's retail presence in Thailand. He owns Berli Jucker PCL, the listed retail arm of TCC.

== Personal life ==
His wife is Khunying Wanna. He has five children. His son, Thapana Sirivadhanabhakdi, is now the chief executive officer at ThaiBev and his daughter Wallapa Traisorat is the chief executive officer and President of Asset World Corporation. His youngest son, Panote Sirivadhanabhakdi, is a member of the board executive committee of F&N. His youngest daughter, Thapanee Techajareonvikul is an executive director and her husband Aswin Techajareonvikul Chief Executive Officer and President of Berli Jucker Company. He is a follower of Buddhism.

== Honours and awards ==
Thai royal decorations:

- The Knight Grand Cordon (Special Class) of the Most Exalted Order of the White Elephant
- The Knight Grand Cordon (First Class) of the Most Noble Order of the Crown of Thailand
- The Knight Commander (Second Class Lower Grade) of the Most Illustrious Order of Chula Chom Klao
- The Knight Grand Cross (First Class) of the Most Admirable Order of the Direkgunabhorn.

Honorary doctorates:

- Maejo University
- Huachiew Chalermprakiet University
- Eastern Asia University
- Mae Fah Luang University
- Chandrakasem Rajabhat University.

=== Foreign honours ===
- Honorary Commander of the Order of Loyalty to the Crown of Malaysia (P.S.M.) (2017). The recipient of this award receives the title Tan Sri and his wife Puan Sri.

== Allegations of abuse of political connections ==
=== Links to former prime minister of Thailand ===
Prem Tinsulanonda, the former military general and prime minister of Thailand who sat on ThaiBev's board of directors in the early-2000s, helped rescue Charoen's Surathip Group, the distributor of Chang beer, in 1986. The company at the time owed 14 billion baht (approximately US$450 million) to banks and six billion baht (approximately US$190 million) to the state before Tinsulanonda reportedly stepped in to help the company gain a monopoly over the liquor industry by restructuring contracts to reduce annual "burdens". Chang was also reportedly classified as an "economy brand", which meant a lower excise tax.

=== Protection of business interests ===
Since the 1997 Asian financial crisis and attempts to further liberalize Thailand's competition laws in 1999, Charoen has on occasion been able to use his political connections to increase his dominance over the country's alcohol industry.

Charoen reportedly launched a campaign of resistance against the liberalisation of the local whisky market in the late-1990s and early-2000s. He was reportedly able to do this due to his increasing clout since the 1997 Asian financial crisis, which saw him rescue hundreds of politically connected, debt-ridden Thai companies and projects. This includes the acquisition of the large Bangkok IT shopping mall, Pantip Plaza from Chalermchai Vaseenont, who set regulations for the local liquor industry in his capacity as a former director general of the country's excise department at the Ministry of Finance.

Charoen's assistance has brought certain "bureaucratic paybacks". For example, following the liberalization of the Thai market, the government implemented several tough new environmental regulations for the construction of new plants, making it very difficult for new rivals to enter the liquor market. Charoen was able to avoid these new regulations as he had won all 12 bids for the previously government-held distilleries it ran on concession.

His assistance during the 1997 Asian financial crisis has also reportedly brought him some level of protection from media criticism: a programme on a military-controlled radio station was, for example, allegedly taken off the air after it ran an unflattering report on Charoen that included allegations of tax evasion.

Several competitors have protested against some of Charoen's activities. Boon Rawd Brewery, the producer of Singha beer, complained to Thailand's Fair Trade Department in October 2000 about Charoen's dumping of cheap products on the market, which the company claimed impeded competition. Charoen was warned that his actions were "inappropriate"; however, the department eventually ruled in his favour after claiming that no law had been violated as regulations regarding the issue had not yet been finalised. Thailand's commerce minister allegedly did not participate in the deliberations and the details of the decision-making process have never been made public.
