= Wallapa Traisorat =

Thai business executive

Wallapa Traisorat (Chinese: 苏玲玲; pinyin: Sū Línglíng) is a Thai business executive. She is the CEO and President of Asset World Corporation.

== Biography ==
Traisorat completed a Bachelor of Architecture (with Distinction) from Silpakorn University, Bangkok, followed by a Master of Philosophy in Land Economy from the University of Cambridge and a Master’s Degree in Regional and Urban Planning from the London School of Economics and Political Science (LSE), UK.

Traisorat has worked in several international companies including Merrill Lynch Asia Pacific Limited in Hong Kong as a financial analyst. In 2001, she returned to Thailand and joined TCC Holding Company Limited as executive director; she later became president.

In this role, she set up TCC Land Company Limited as a holding company for a range of real estate projects including hotels, retail, commercial buildings, a convention center, golf courses, master plan development and landbanks.

=== Personal life ===
Traisorat is married to Soammaphat Traisorat, CEO of TCC Capital Land. They have five children. She is the daughter of Charoen Sirivadhanabhakdi and his wife Khunying Wanna.
