= Asset World Corporation =

- ISIN: TH9436010002
- Industry: Real estate
- Founded: 2009
- Headquarters: Thailand

Asset World Corp Public Company Limited, branded as Asset World Corporation or AWC, is a Thai real estate company majority-owned by billionaire Charoen Sirivadhanabhakdi and his TCC Group. The company was founded in 2009 as First Destination Co., Ltd., and was renamed in 2016 and listed on the Stock Exchange of Thailand in 2019. Led by CEO Wallapa Traisorat, who is Charoen's daughter, its business is focused on hospitality and retail property development, and includes multiple hotels operated by international chain brands as well as well-known properties such as Asiatique and Empire Tower. The company is pursuing major urban re-development projects in the Woeng Nakhon Khasem area of Bangkok's Chinatown, in Pattaya, and at Asiatique.

== History ==
In 2026, AWC announced a 8 billion Baht investment into Asiatique, including a new mixed-used development across the Chao Phraya River on Charoen Nakhon road in Khlong San district, the MONA Bangkok art museum, and a new cable car crossing the Chao Phraya River.
