= Dakota Hotels =

UK-based hotel brand

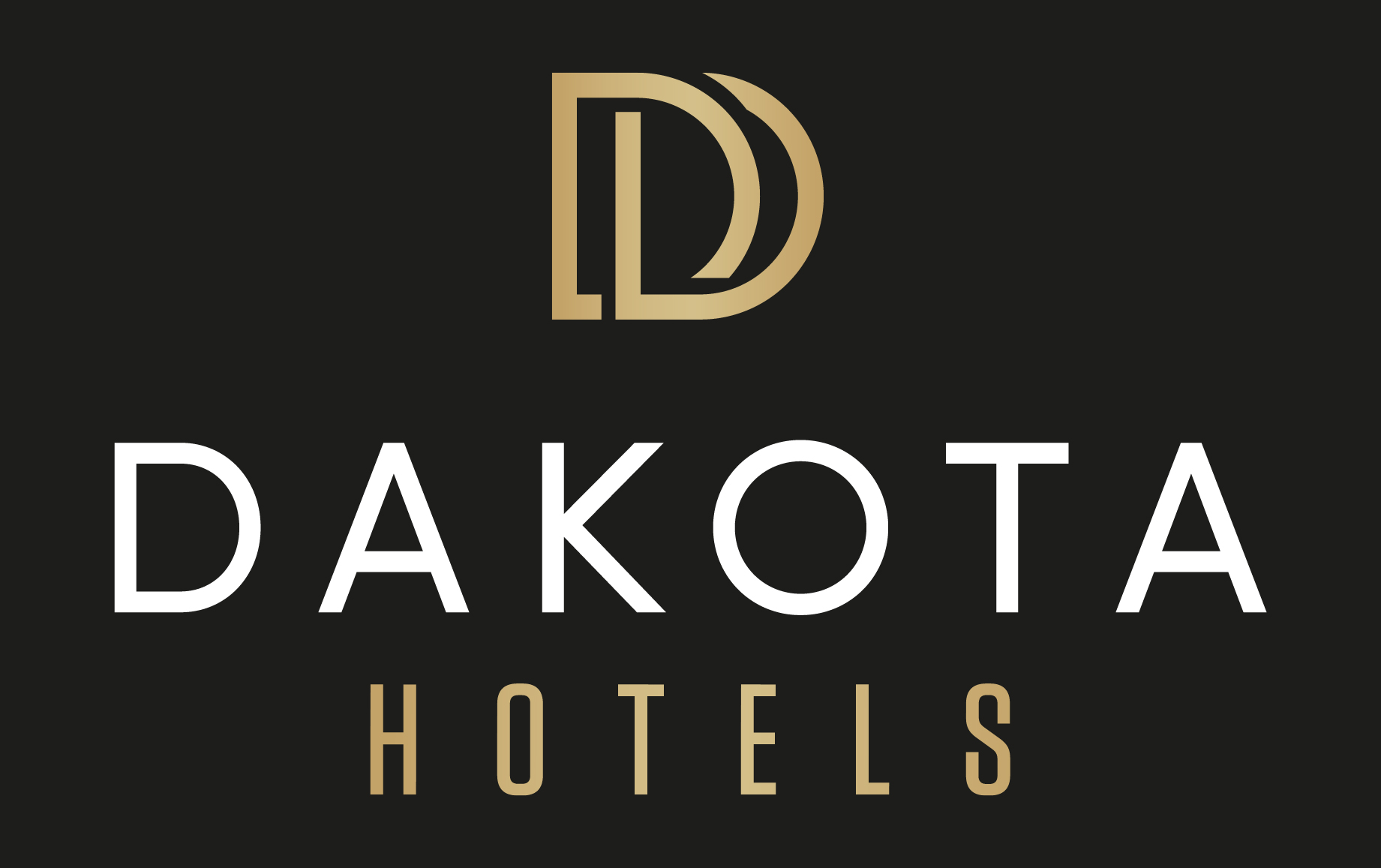

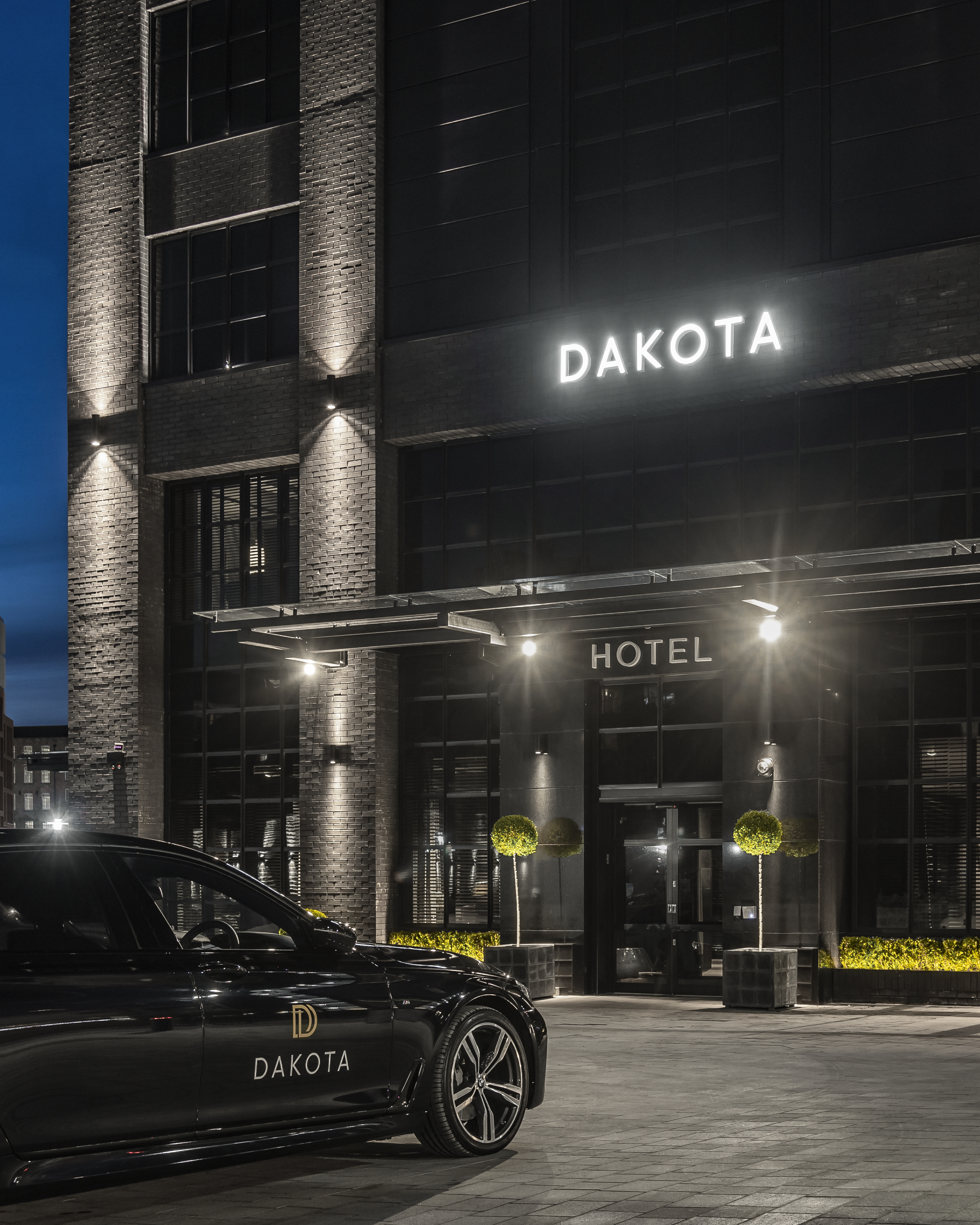
- Type: Private
- Industry: Hotel, Hospitality, Restaurant
- Founded: 2006
- Number of locations: 6 (Edinburgh, Eurocentral, Glasgow, Leeds, Manchester) (Newcastle-upon-Tyne)
- Key people: Ken McCulloch (Founder)
- Owner: Evans Property Group
- Website: dakotahotels.co.uk

Dakota Hotels is a UK-based hotel brand with seven locations, each with a brasserie-style grill and cocktail bars. Dakota Hotels first opened two boutique hotels near Edinburgh Airport in South Queensferry, and in Eurocentral, Motherwell South East of Glasgow. The brand has now expanded into Central Glasgow, Leeds, Newcastle and Manchester. The brand was founded by Ken McCulloch and is owned by Evans Property Group.

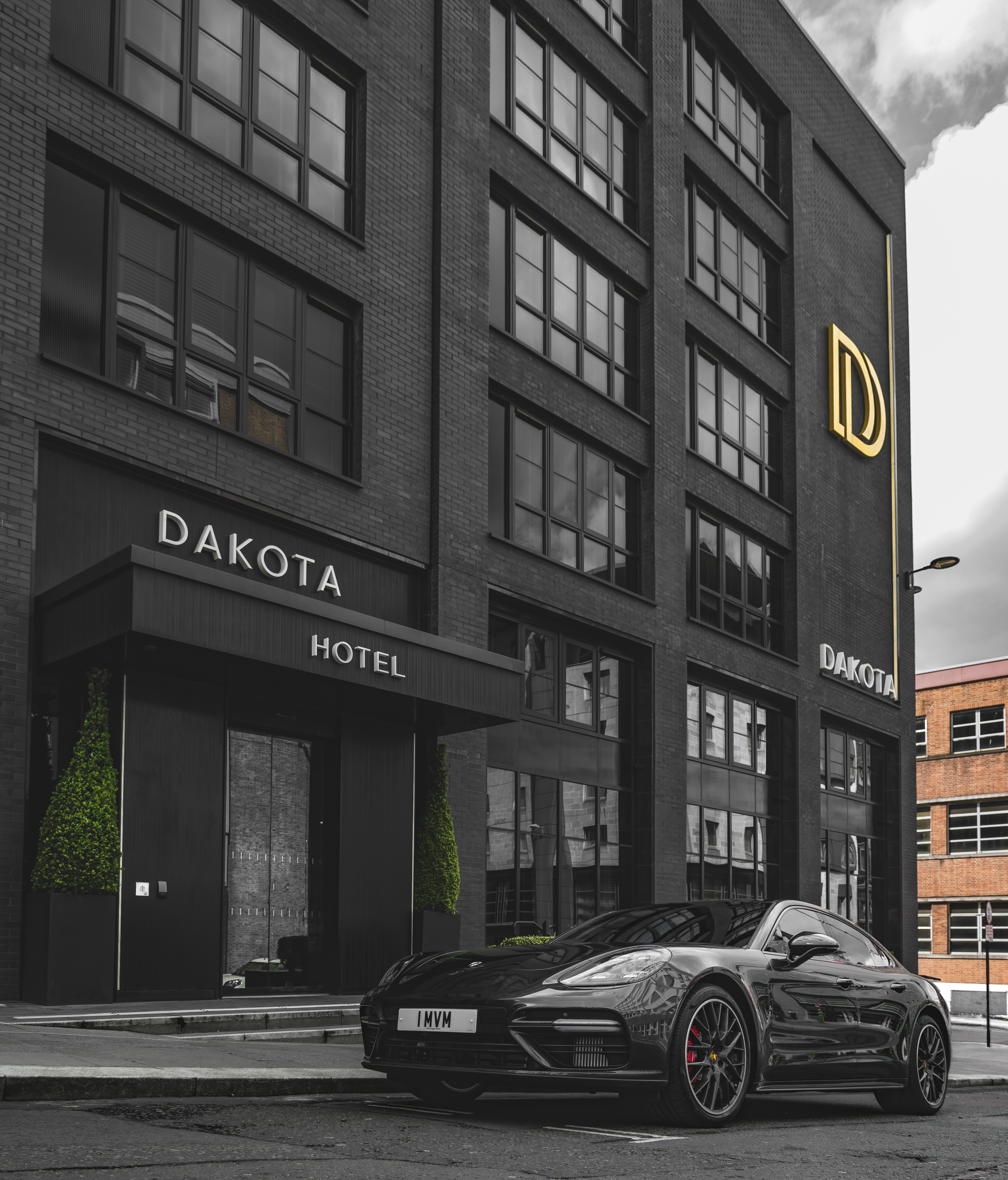
Hotel Exterior, Dakota Glasgow.

== History ==
The brand was named after the Douglas DC-3 aircraft introduced in 1936 for commercial air travel in the United States, which was designated the Dakota in Royal Air Force service.

The press have reported celebrities as staying at Dakota Hotels including Hugh Jackman, Arnold Schwarzenegger, Katy Perry, Liam Gallagher, Stereophonics, The Stone Roses, Glenn Close, Melanie Brown, Noel Gallagher, Christian Slater, Gary Lineker, and Andy Murray.

== Brand Expansion ==
The Dakota Hotel in Newcastle officially opened to the public on March 29, 2025. This marks the sixth location for the boutique hotel group Dakota Hotels. The hotel is situated on the Quayside, offering views of the Tyne River.

Dakota Eurocentral was opened in 2006 as a new build in Motherwell, off the M8 motorway in Lanarkshire, followed subsequently by another new build in South Queensferry close to Edinburgh Airport by the Queensferry Crossing in 2007.

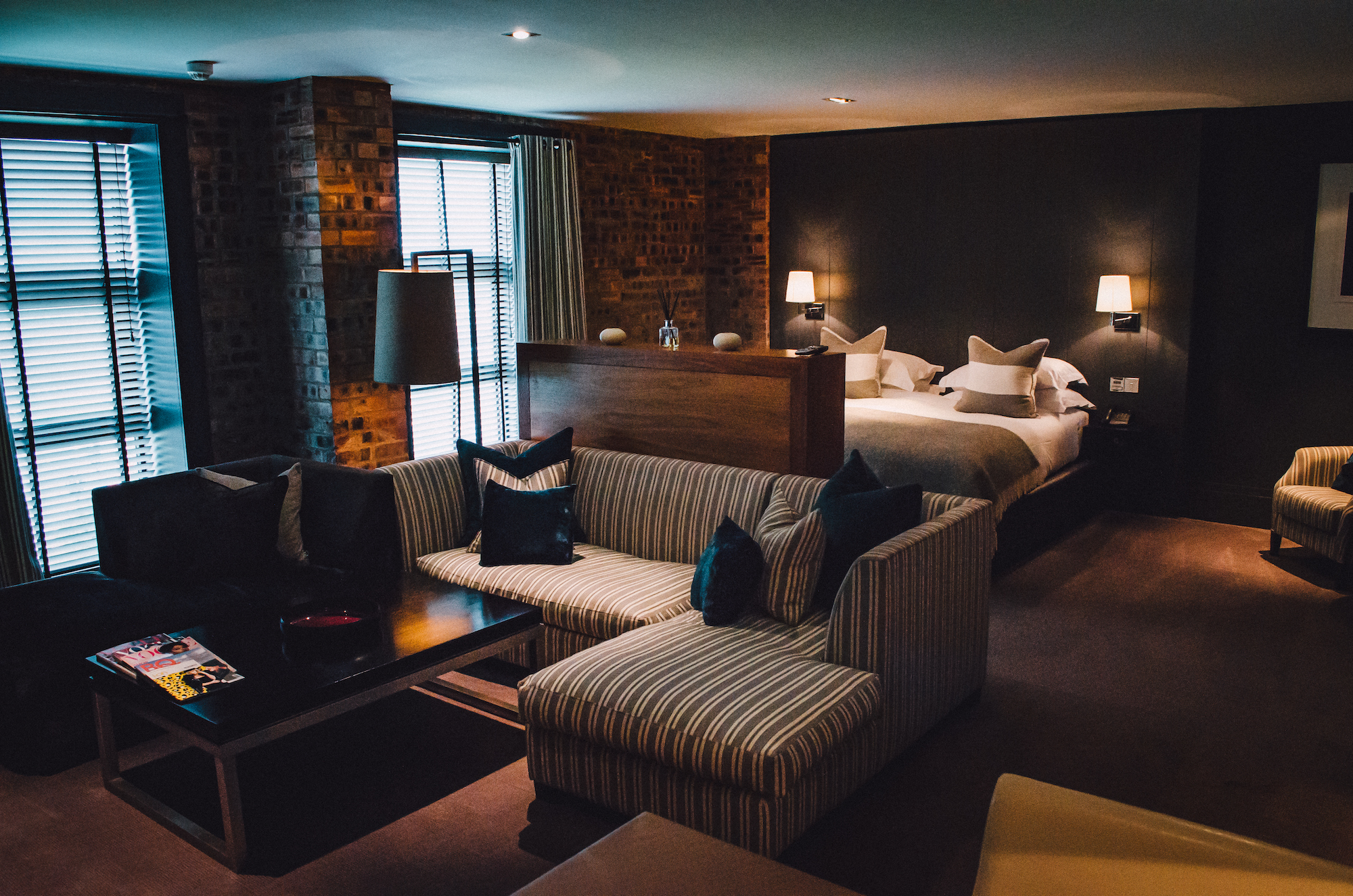
A bedroom in Dakota Eurocentral.

A third hotel and the first city centre location was opened on West Regent Street in Glasgow in 2016 followed by a fourth on Greek street in Leeds in early 2017.

The largest hotel is in Manchester city centre, near to Manchester Piccadilly railway station, with 137 bedrooms opened in May 2019.

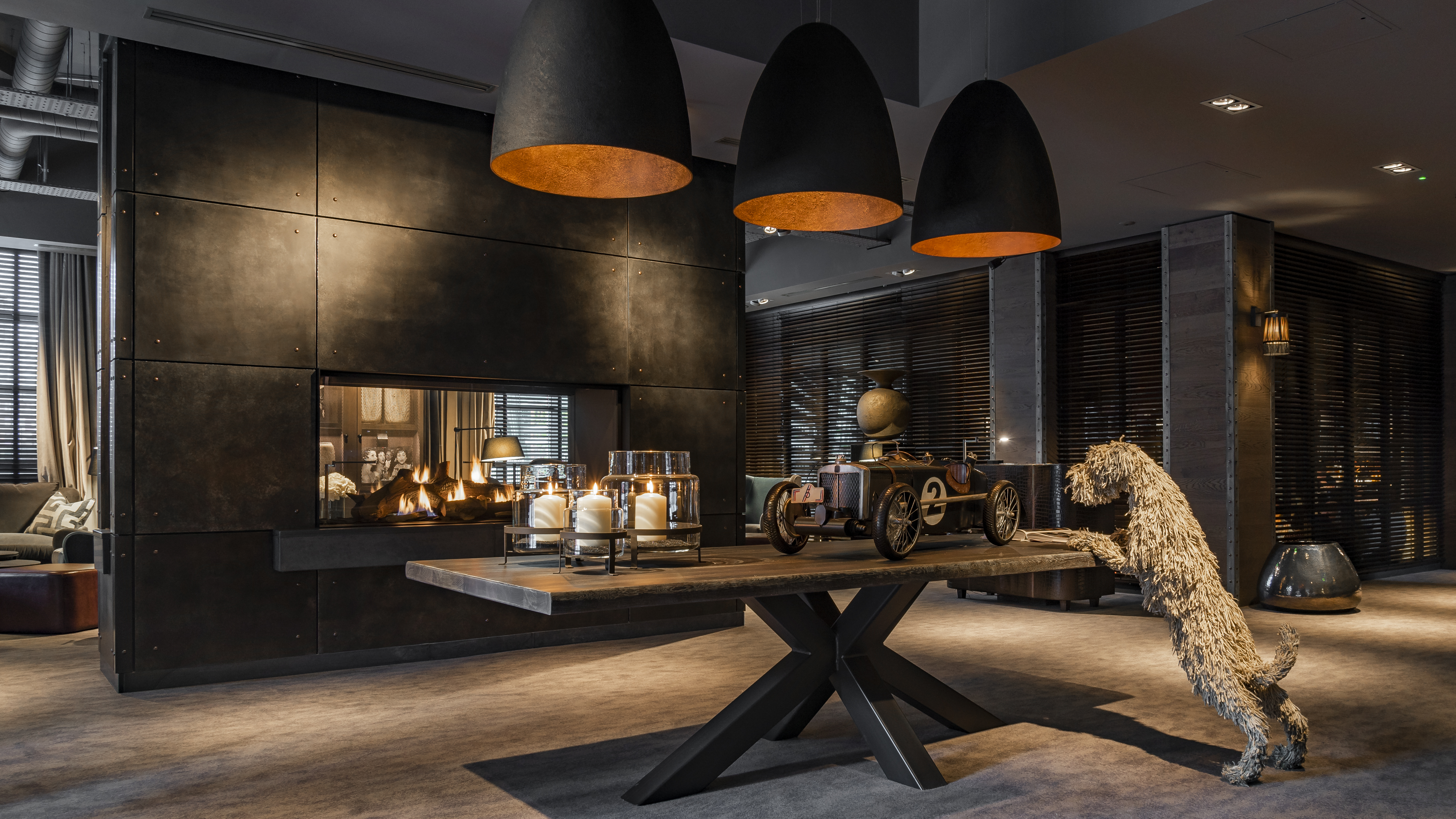
The Lobby in Dakota Manchester.

== Founder ==
Dakota was created by Glasgow born hotelier Ken McCulloch. Other hotels previously launched by McCulloch include One Devonshire Gardens in Glasgow, the Malmaison brand, the Columbus Hotel Monaco, and the Aviator Hotel at Farnborough Airport.

Hotel interiors were designed by Amanda Rosa Interiors (Ken McCulloch's wife), who also designed the Malmaison brand and Columbus Hotel Monaco.

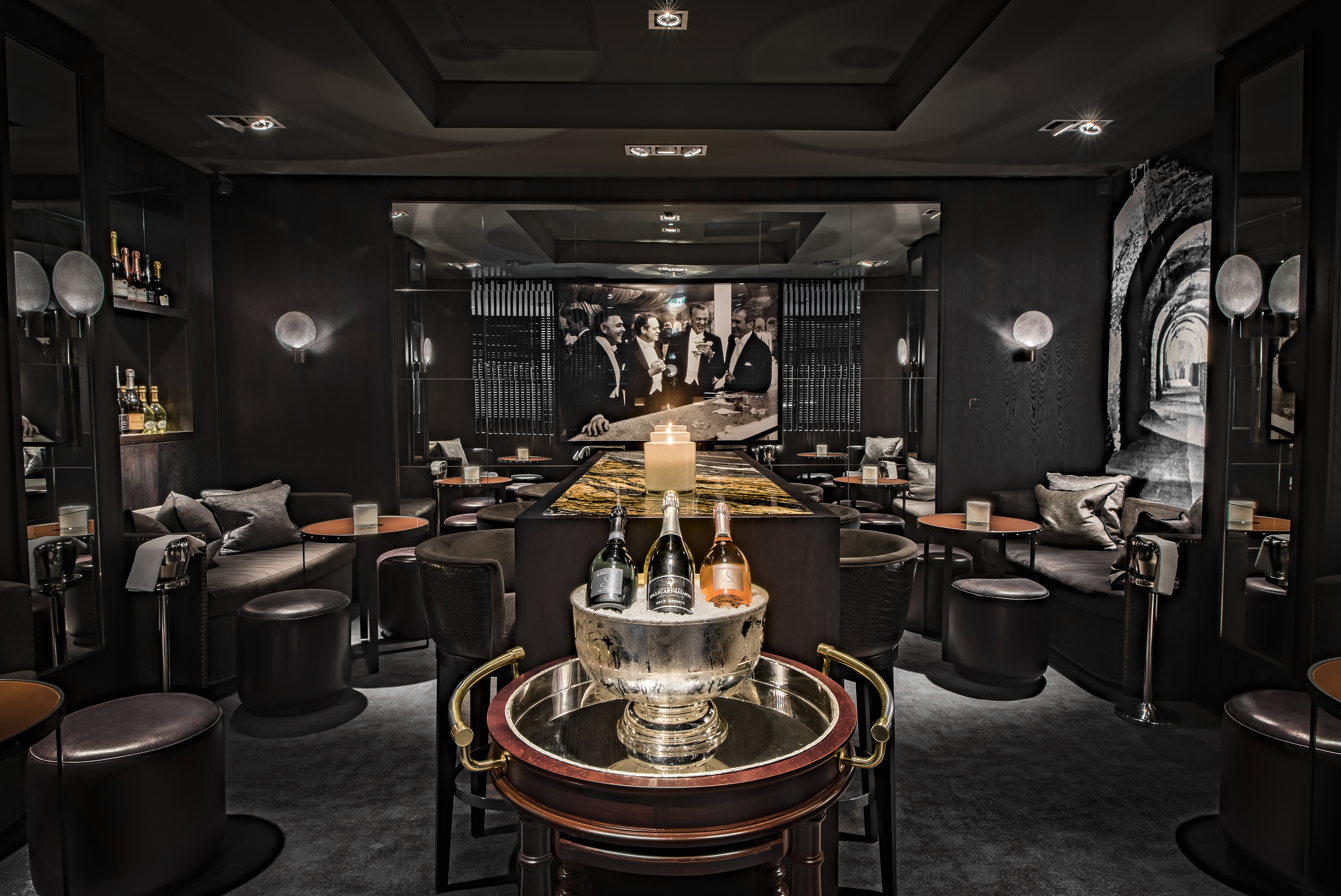
The Champagne Room in Dakota Leeds.

== Educational partnerships ==
Dakota Hotels has established links with Queen Margaret University and Fife College to provide internships to hospitality students. Dakota Hotels is part of the Mentor Scheme formed between the Manchester Hotelier’s Association (MHA) and Manchester Metropolitan University (MMU).

The hotel has previously established awards for university students at Queen Margaret University, focusing on dissertations in hospitality.

Dakota Hotels is a 2021 sponsor of HIT Scotland, a scholarship programme designed to support people working and studying in the hospitality industry in Scotland.

== Awards ==
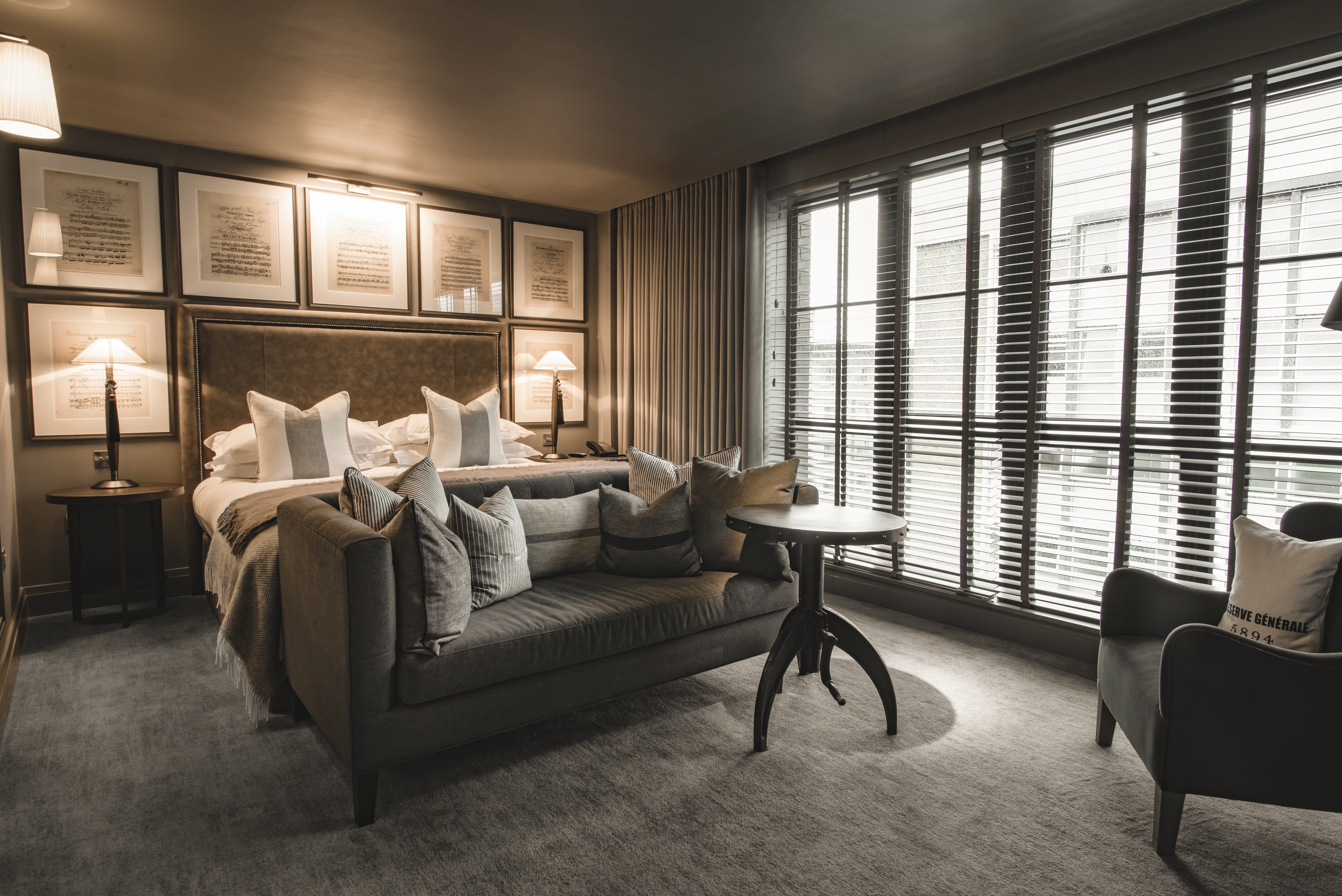
A bedroom in Dakota Glasgow.

- TripAdvisor Travellers' Choice Awards 2021 – Top 25 Hotels in the UK
- The Caterer – Top 30 Best Places to Work in Hospitality 2021
- The Michelin Guide – Michelin Plate 2021
- The Caterer – Top 10 Best Places to Work in Hospitality 2020
- GQ Magazine 2018 Best Hotel – Shortlist of 5
- TripAdvisor Travellers' Choice Awards 2018 – Top 25 Hotels in the UK
- The Independent 2018 Best in Contemporary Design
- The Times Cool Hotel Guide 2013
- Jamie Oliver Best Kept Secret Award 2013
- Condé Nast Traveller Hot list 2005

Ken McCulloch was the 2018 winner of the "Very Special Achievement award" at the Scottish Style Awards and was the 1993 winner of The Caterer's Hotelier of the Year.
