= Amaryllis (restaurant) =

- Interactive map of Amaryllis

Restaurant information
- Established: 2001; 25 years ago
- Closed: 2004; 22 years ago
- Head chef: David Dempsey (2001–2003)
- Chef: Gordon Ramsay
- Location: One Devonshire Gardens, Glasgow, Scotland
- Coordinates: 55.88°N 4.30°W

Amaryllis was a restaurant located in the One Devonshire Gardens hotel in Glasgow, Scotland. It was opened by chef Gordon Ramsay, with David Dempsey operating the restaurant on a daily basis for the celebrity chef. It was awarded a Michelin star in 2002, which it held until the restaurant's closure in 2004.

== History ==
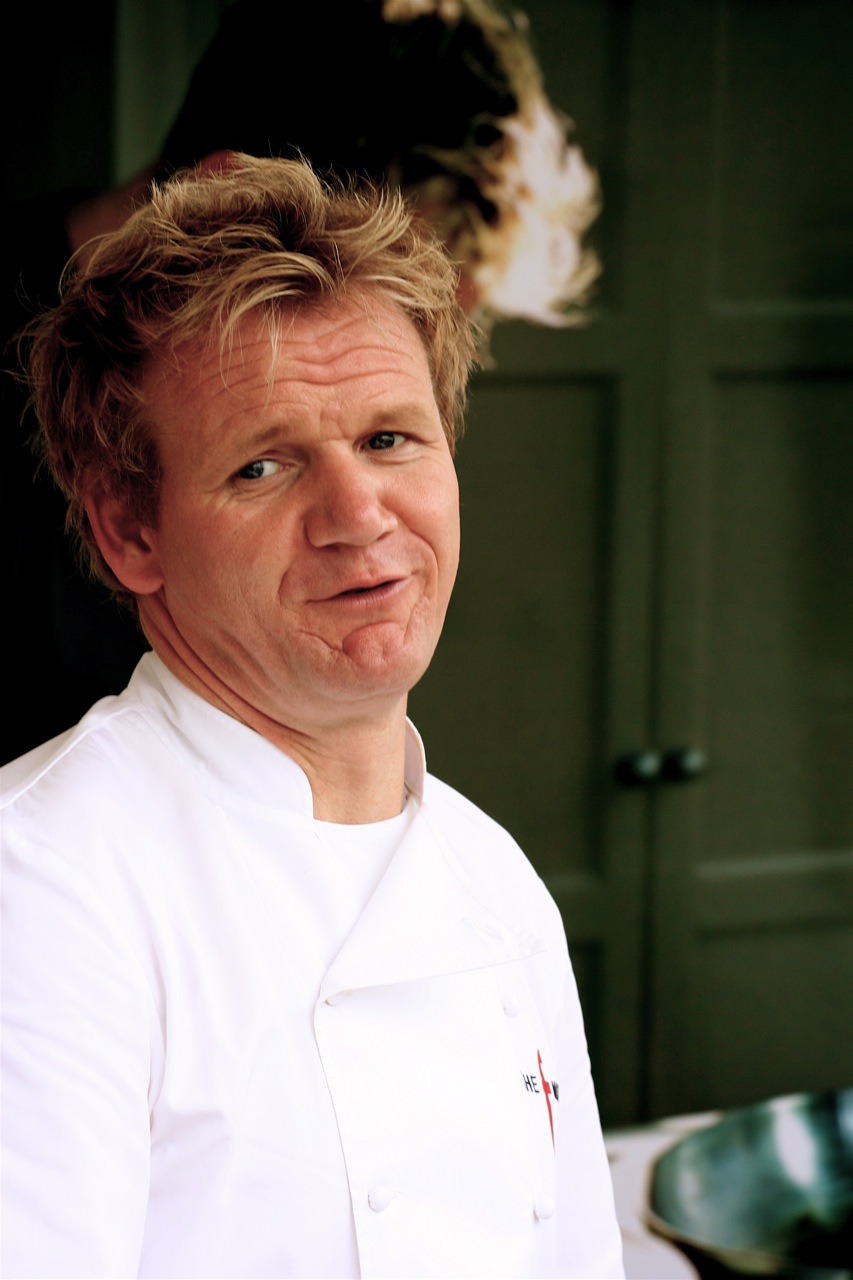
Gordon Ramsay launched Amaryllis, his first Scottish restaurant

Celebrity chef Gordon Ramsay was inspired to launch a Scottish restaurant in his hometown of Glasgow on behalf of his protege David Dempsey, who became the first chef de cuisine in 2001. Dempsey had previously been sous chef under Ramsay at Restaurant Gordon Ramsay in London. Angela Hartnett helped to launch the restaurant. It took Ramsay two years to find an appropriate venue in Glasgow, and set up the restaurant in the One Devonshire Gardens hotel towards the west of the city. It was Ramsay's first restaurant in Scotland.

Seven months after opening, it was awarded a Michelin star. In April 2003, Dempsey moved on from the restaurant to become head chef at Restaurant Gordon Ramsay. On 3 May 2003, Dempsey fell to his death from a second floor flat window after apparently breaking into the property.

It closed the day before the new Michelin star list was announced in 2006, which presented Ramsay as the most starred chef in the world with seven stars despite the loss of the star from Amaryllis. Ramsay was on a family holiday at the time. At the time of closing, the restaurant was fully booked on Friday and Saturday nights for the following six weeks with some 770 bookings, but was reportedly quiet the rest of the week, resulting in Ramsay's concern that the service was at risk of losing the restaurant's Michelin star. It had closed for two days a week because of falling numbers of bookings. During the course of its three years, it lost £480,000, and had lost around £200,000 in the previous year.

Ramsay admitted he later felt relieved to close the restaurant following the death of Dempsey, stating, "I am just glad that I am not involved in the saga of David’s family any more and I can finally lock the door."

Ramsay filmed the first series of Ramsay's Kitchen Nightmares for Channel 4 after the closure of Amaryllis. This led to some confrontations with the restaurateurs on the show regarding Ramsay's ability to advise them on the show. The space was taken over by John Pallagi and Simon Wright, who opened their restaurant Room. Ramsay offered to help the pair as part of the second series of Kitchen Nightmares, but they declined.

Ramsay would later reference the closure of Amaryllis on the Kitchen Nightmares season 1 episode, "The Olde Stone Mill."

=== Menu ===
Scottish produce was highlighted in the menus and included signature dishes from Ramsay's range, such as lobster ravioli and langoustine poached in a lobster bisque with a purée of fennel. Scottish spring lamb was also on the menu, served with aubergine caviar, tomatoes, and rosemary jus. On launch, the restaurant offered two fixed-price menus at £25 for three courses or six courses for £40.

Before closing, it offered a reduced-price menu to customers in the main dining room but kept a more expensive menu for customers in the adjoining drawing-room.

== Reception ==
Lucy Bannall visited the restaurant ten days after it first opened. After a mix up with orders, she was disappointed with the amuse-bouche, but thought the food was "marvellous" by the time she reached her main course. Overall, she felt like it was a bit "erratic" but couldn't pinpoint exactly why she felt that way.

The restaurant was criticised as being too sophisticated for Glasgow, something which Ramsay responded to after the closure by saying "I'd relish the challenge to open up in Glasgow again but I wouldn’t do fine dining, not a three or four course dinner. We were setting the criteria too high and that’s my fault".

=== Awards and ratings ===
Amaryllis was awarded a Michelin star in 2002, which had been previously awarded to another restaurant at One Devonshire Gardens since 1995.
