= SGC =

SGC may refer to:

== Science and technology ==
- Satellite ground station
- Server-Gated Cryptography
- Soluble guanylate cyclase (sGC)
- Standard Geographical Classification code (Canada)
- Structural Genomics Consortium
- Salivary gland carcinoma, a type of oral cancer
- Swan-Ganz catheter, a type of pulmonary artery catheter

== People and job titles ==
- Swiss Gaming Crew, a new E-Sports Team from League of Legends
- Secretary-General of the Council of the European Union, head of the General Secretariat of the Council
- Stephen Grover Cleveland, 22nd and 24th President of the United States

== Entertainment ==
- Sega Genesis Collection
- SGC (wine)
- Sonic Gems Collection
- Southern Gospel Choir
- Stargate Command
- ScrewAttack Gaming Convention
- SGC Records (Screen Gems-Columbia) a subsidiary of Atlantic Records that distributed the Nazz
