= Frasers Property Australia =

Australian property group

- Company type: Subsidiary
- Industry: Property
- Founded: 1924
- Headquarters: Rhodes, New South Wales, Australia
- Key people: Anthony Boyd (CEO) Rod Fehring (Executive Chairman); Mark Gleeson (Executive General Manager) Cameron Leggatt (Executive General Manager)
- Number of employees: Over 700 (Australia)
- Parent: Frasers Property
- Website: www.frasersproperty.com.au

Frasers Property Australia is a diversified property group with activities across Australia covering the development of residential land, housing and apartments, commercial, retail and property management. It is the Australian division of Frasers Property, a Singaporean multinational real estate and property management company listed on the Main Board of the Singapore Exchange.

== History ==
The origins of the company date back to the 1920s, when it was established with the incorporation of TM Burke Pty Ltd. In the 1960s, TM Burke merged with Land and Housing Division of the Hooker Corporation. In 1990, the company began trading under the Australian Housing and Land name, also known as Australand. In 1997, Australand was listed on the Australian Securities Exchange and the Singapore Exchange. In 2000 Walker Corporation was acquired, with FCL beginning its first development in Australia – the Pavilions on the Bay at Glebe Point. Between 2001 and 2002, the Australand Wholesale Property Trusts were established and in the following year, the Australand Property Trust was renamed Australand Property Group. In 2011, Australand was listed on the Australian real estate investment trust index while delisted from the Singapore Exchange. In 2014, Australand was acquired by Frasers Centrepoint and privatised in October of that year. The same year, FCL formerly the property arm of the Fraser & Neave group, was listed on the SGX. In August 2015 Australand adopted the Frasers Property brand. In October 2015 Frasers Property Australia launched a retail business unit. In 2016, Frasers Logistics & Industrial Trust were listed on SGX and they also launched the sustainability strategy called "A Different Way".

== One Central Park, Sydney ==
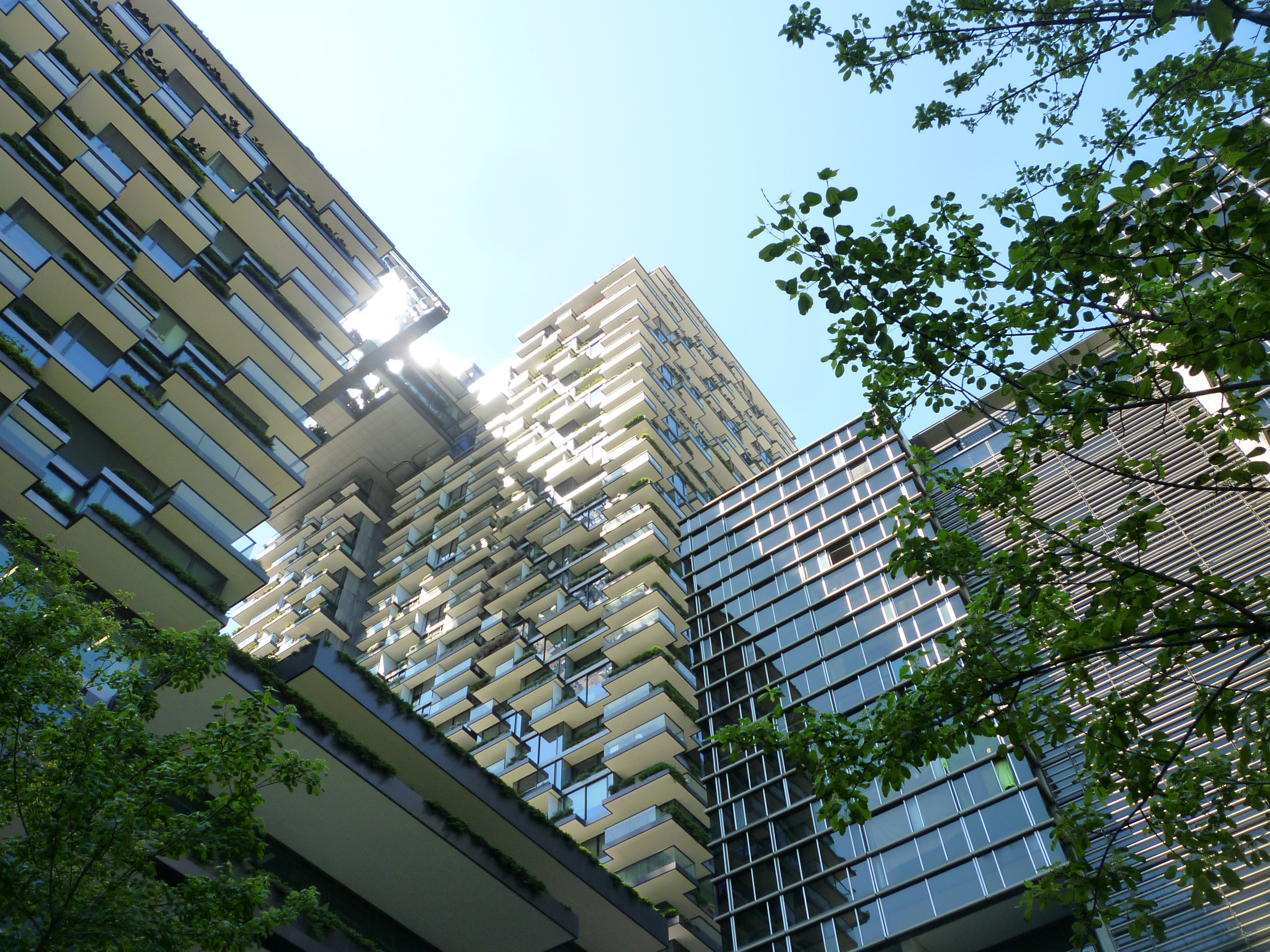
The pattern of balconies and flash of the cantilevered heliostat in the eastern tower of One Central Park Sydney

One development of the company is the One Central Park skyscraper, a mixed used urban renewal project located in Chippendale. The skyscraper was awarded a 5 star Green Star – 'Multi-Unit Residential Design v1' Certified Rating by the Green Building Council of Australia in 2013, making it the largest multi-residential building (by nett lettable area) in Australia to receive such a designation. In 2014, it was awarded the CTBUH Skyscraper Award, of the Best Tall Building Worldwide from the Council for Tall Buildings and Urban Habitat.
