= Eurocentral =

Industrial estate in South Lanarkshire, Scotland

Coordinates: 55.83147°N 3.97937°W

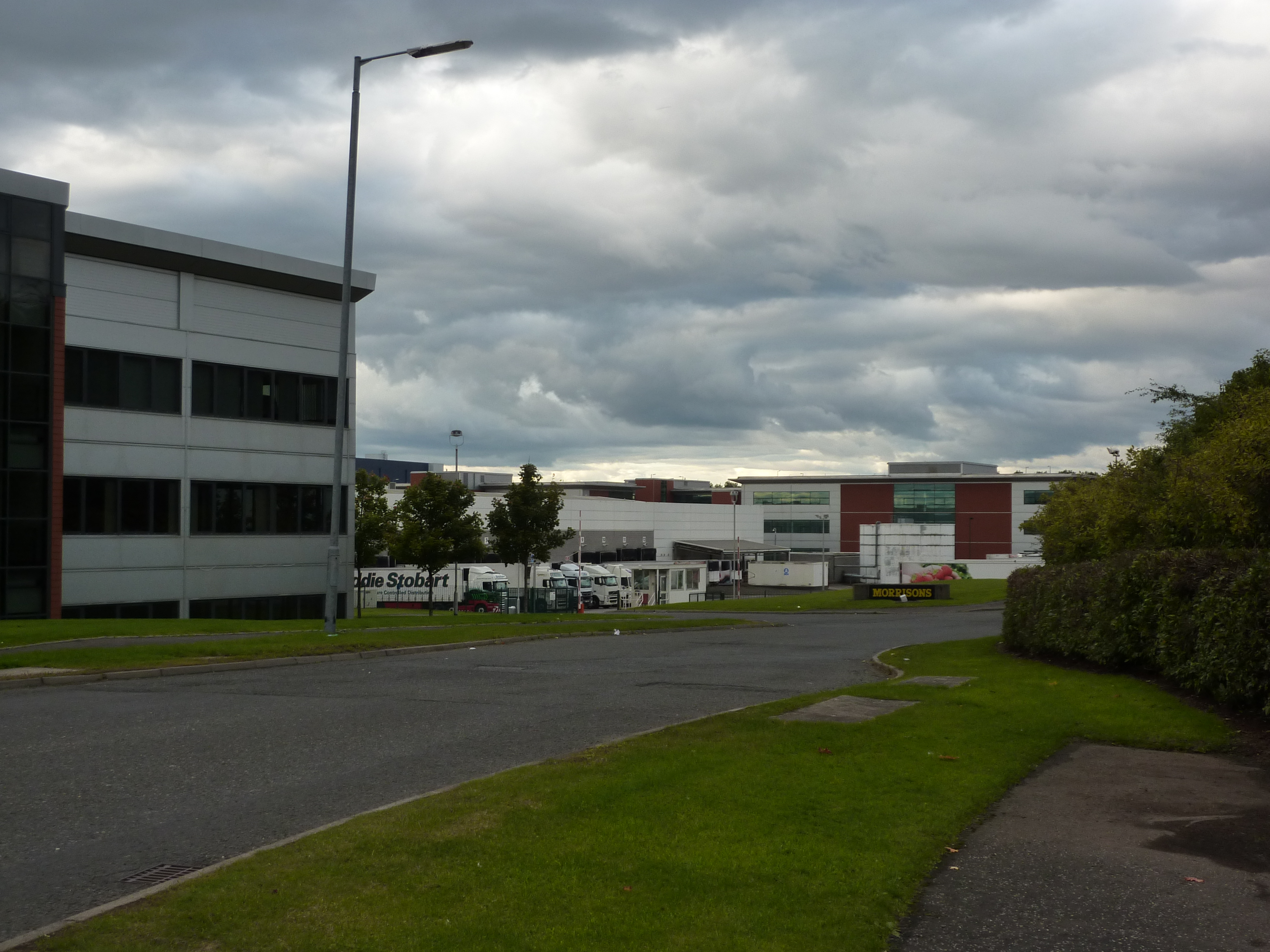
Morrisons' distribution centre

Eurocentral is one of the largest industrial estates in Scotland, just off the M8 motorway, about 12 miles (19 kilometres) east of Glasgow city centre and 34 mi (55 km) west of Edinburgh. The nearest communities to the estate are Holytown, Mossend, Chapelhall, Calderbank and Carnbroe. The closest major towns are Bellshill 4 mi (6 km), Motherwell 4 mi (6 km), Coatbridge 4 mi (6 km) and Airdrie 4 1/2 mi (7 km).

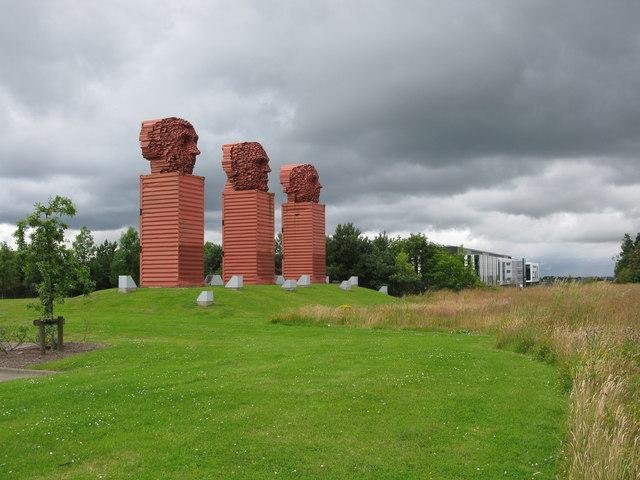
"The Big Heids" sculpture

There is a bus link to and from Glasgow city centre, Edinburgh Airport and Edinburgh city centre operated by Scottish Citylink. Eurocentral has warehouse distribution centres, factories, call centres, a railfreight centre which links with Grangemouth docks 28 mi (45 km) to the north east, England to the south and beyond to mainland Europe. The estate also has a large modern hotel/restaurant (Dakota). One of the landmarks of the Eurocentral are the so-called "Big Heids" which are three red upturned shipping containers with tubes making the shape of human heads.

The Maxim Office Park is a recent addition opening in March 2010. With 10 buildings totalling over 756,000 sq ft (70,200 m^{2}). Built in a single phase, Maxim is also the UK’s largest speculatively built office park.

== Eurocentral factory ==
Eurocentral was the name given to a former factory near Holytown operated by the Taiwanese television parts manufacturer Chunghwa Picture Tubes (中華映管). The building is sometimes referred to as The Chunghwa Factory, and is locally infamous because it was built using large amounts of taxpayers’ money but was demolished within ten years. Originally designed as a factory to produce cathode ray tubes for use in television sets and monitors, the rapid rise in popularity of LCD and plasma televisions contributed to the huge losses made by the Chunghwa company. It is also reported that a huge water bill from West of Scotland Water also helped contribute to the eventual demise of the site. Opening in 1996, the factory was expected to create 3,000 local jobs. However, employment never rose above 1,200 and the factory was empty by 2003. The company was forced to repay £8 million of the £20 million funding grant it received from the UK Government. The factory was demolished and the site developed into a mixed-use commercial and business park. The collapse of the Chunghwa venture came to symbolise the beginning of a general decline of Scotland's Silicon Glen boom after reaching its peak in the early-mid 1990s.

== Maxim Park ==
The £330 million park is the UK’s largest speculative office park development, comprising 10 buildings, totalling 756,000 sq ft (70,200 m^{2}) of high-quality space. The entire park was completed in March 2010. As well as Grade A office accommodation and a wide range of shops, leisure facilities and one of the Dakota Hotels (although not part of the Maxim estate it is very close by and built in keeping with the park's image).

Some current tenants include: Amey, Balfour Beatty, first direct, Linear Group, Proact IT, Policy Expert, Regus, SEPA, TClarke, Vaillant and Virgin Media O2.

== Sources ==
- "Chungwha Factory - The Parr Partnership, Eurocentral"
- "Chunghwa factory demolition starts"
- "Chunghwa plant sold in £300m deal; Tritax deal to redevelop". Sunday Herald. 22 February 2004. Archived from the original on 8 March 2008 – via FindArticles.
