= JustCo =

Singapore-based coworking space provider

- Company type: Flexible Workspace Provider
- Founded: 2011
- Founder: Kong Wan Sing
- Headquarters: Singapore
- Number of locations: 8 Countries; Australia, China, Indonesia, Singapore, South Korea, Taiwan, Thailand, Japan
- Key people: Kong Wan Sing ( Founder and CEO )
- Products: Flexible workspaces for entrepreneurs, startups, small and large businesses
- Brands: JustCo
- Services: Shared workspaces, coworking spaces and related services
- Website: www.justcoglobal.com

JustCo is a Singaporean company that provides coworking workspaces for individuals and companies. Headquartered in Singapore, JustCo was founded in 2011 by Kong Wan Sing, its current CEO, alongside co-founders Liu Lu and Kong Wan Long, as a response to increasing demand for flexible workspaces. As of October 2025, JustCo operates coworking centres across the Asia-Pacific region.

== History ==
JustCo was founded in Singapore in 2011 by property developer and businessman Kong Wan Sing. Kong had originally started a finance firm in Boston in 1998 after graduating from the Stern School of Business. He then worked in the real estate branch of Sing Long Group, a Malaysia-based company owned by his family.

Kong moved to Singapore where he worked for Mapletree Investments prior to starting JustCo. By 2015, it was the largest coworking space in Asia and rebranded to JustCo.

In 2018, JustCo expanded overseas to Thailand, opening four coworking spaces in Bangkok after an investment by Thai developer Sansiri, followed by an expansion into Indonesia in mid-2018. Expansion into other markets, including Taiwan, Australia and South Korea, was supported by investments by Singaporean wealth fund GIC and real estate company Frasers Property. The same year, it opened its fourth property in Seoul, a 16-storey tower in Gangnam District which was the largest property leased by the company at that time, and the first time it had leased an entire building.

In December 2019, the company secured a partnership with Japanese construction and real estate firm Daito Trust to develop office spaces in Japan By April 2020, JustCo serviced 1,400 companies in Singapore across 19 locations, as well as 42 centres in Asia and Australia.

The company continued to opened office spaces in Singapore in November 2020 at OCBC Centre East and The Centrepoint, with the latter housing the Singapore offices for L'Oréal and Riot Games.

In 2024 JustCo launched a luxury coworking brand, The Collective, with an inaugural site in GranTokyo South Tower, Tokyo. In 2025 it introduced The Boring Office, a digital-first flexible workspace concept in Singapore.

== Business structure and services ==
JustCo redesigns the interiors of large office spaces and buildings, subletting them to companies and individuals upon completion. All locations feature common areas such as event spaces, meeting rooms and cafe. Large-scale corporations make up more than half of clients, compared to traditional coworking tenants who target startups or freelancers. All JustCo locations feature common areas, such as event spaces, meeting rooms and café. In 2018 the company opened its first curated business community space, the Verizon Innovation Community in Singapore, formed with Verizon Communications as a space for digital and technology companies.

In 2019, JustCo created a start-up incubation programme called JustCo Labs, developed as a partnership with Trive Ventures.

JustCo at The Centrepoint office in Singapore was opened in 2020 and is the first location to offer pay-per-minute space for members of the public to rent. The JustCo app allows members to access any office globally, to book spaces or resources. In June 2020, the company partnered with NewCampus to offer a business networking and workshop service entitled JustCo Campus.

In December 2020, the company launched the Digital Future of Work Platform, allowing users to book office space in JustCo centres and shared office locations not a part of the JustCo company. The service incorporates the AI SixSense, which monitors office traffic, allowing users to have real-time information on crowdedness of spaces, to ensure social distance in office spaces.
