= SGC (wine) =

Bordeaux wine brand

SGC is a brand of three Bordeaux wines coming from parcels of land that were not discovered at the time of the Bordeaux Wine Official Classification of 1855. The secret parcels on both left and right banks of Gironde river produce a Grand Vin. SGC parcels are small in size and produce a red wine in the following appellations: Medoc, Pomerol and Saint-Emilion Grand Cru.

Each of the wines have their own blend of grape varieties matching the specifics of the appellation. On average, SGC produces 1,500 cases per year. Created in 2006 by Arnaud Christiaens, a former financier in 2006, it quickly gained recognition from famous wine critics such as Michel Bettane and Jancis Robinson. World champion sommelier, Gerard Basset, was an ambassador and shareholder of the brand. Nina, his wife, remains a shareholder.

== History ==
Oenophile financier Arnaud Christiaens founded SGC in 2006 with the goal to produce a wine good enough to compete with the best of the appellation. Jancis Robinson wrote "This is a scheme designed to kick the whole Bordeaux system where it hurts most". Coined as the 'Tesla of Wine' due to its innovative and scientific approach to soil analysis, SGC produces from the highest-rated areas of land. Arnaud's knowledge and respect for the region, combined with his inherent desire to challenge the status quo, led him to develop a business model that would turn the market on its head. He set out to find the best-untapped terroir in the region through in-depth soil analysis, thus adding a new layer of sophistication to Bordeaux's premier status in the wine producing industry.

The enterprise bore its first results with the production of 2006 vintage. As of 2020, SGC is sold by invitation and allocation only, and successful prospective clients are thereby invited to join the feted Le Cercle Group, the community of SGC owners who meet regularly around the world to celebrate and discuss their shared passions. The only exception from this being Hedonism Wines Mayfair, London with the 2009 vintage.

== Recognition ==
World champion sommelier Gérard Basset was an ambassador for the brand from 2012 until his death in 2019.

Master of Wine and wine critic Jancis Robinson wrote that the wines " withstand comparison with first growths" after a blind tasting putting SGC wines up against four first growths.

Notes from Jancis Robinson:

Producer	Appellation	Vintage	Date tasted	Score (/20)
SGC	Pomerol	2009	18/04/2013	19.0
SGC	Médoc	2009	18/04/2013	18.5
SGC	St-Emilion GC	2009	18/04/2013	18.5
