= Ken McCulloch =

Scottish hotelier (1948–2024)

- Born: Kenneth Wilfred McCulloch; 7 November 1948; Glasgow, Scotland
- Died: 20 November 2024 (aged 76); Glasgow, Scotland
- Occupation: Hotelier
- Known for: Founder of Malmaison and Dakota Hotels

Kenneth Wilfred McCulloch (7 November 1948 – 20 November 2024) was a British hotelier, the founder of the hotel chains, Malmaison and Dakota Hotels.

== Life and career ==
McCulloch was born in Glasgow on 7 November 1948. He founded the hotel chains, Malmaison and Dakota Hotels. He later sold the Malmaison in 1986. McCulloch also owned One Devonshire Gardens in Glasgow. McCulloch died in Glasgow in November 2024, aged 76.
