= Robin Hutson =

British hotelier (born 1957)

Robin Hutson OBE
- Born: 1957 (age 68–69); London, England
- Occupation: Hotelier
- Known for: Hotel du Vin, Lime Wood, Soho House, The Pig
- Title: CEO & Chairman of Home Grown Hotels Ltd and LimeWood Group Ltd
- Spouse: Judy Hutson
- Children: 2 sons

Robin Hutson OBE (born 1957) is a British hotelier, listed by The Caterer in 2019 as the UK's second most powerful hotelier.

== Early life ==
When he was 14, his parents decided that he should attend a grammar school in Surrey, rather than London. He did not do well at school and left without attending sixth form. He went on to study hotel and catering operations at Brooklands College in Weybridge, earning an OND.

== Career ==
Hutson started his career as a management trainee with The Savoy Hotel Company, starting at Claridge's, as a waiter and then The Berkeley. He then moved to the Hôtel de Crillon in Paris, and after a spell at Elbow Beach in Bermuda was appointed general manager of Chewton Glen at 28 years old.

In 1994, Hutson co-founded the Hotel du Vin chain with Gerard Basset. In 2004, they sold the company for £66 million. He was chairman of the Soho House Group until 2009.

Since 2009, Hutson has worked closely with chemicals billionaire Jim Ratcliffe on several projects, and Ratcliffe spent £40 million on the Lime Wood hotel in Hampshire, which Hutson runs. They met because their children were at school together. Home Grown Hotels is an equal shares partnership between Hutson, his management team and Ratcliffe.

Hutson is CEO and chairman of Lime Wood Group and of Home Grown Hotels.

He is the winner of numerous industry awards including Hotelier of the Year 2003, two industry Lifetime Achievement Awards in 2016 and 2020. He was awarded an Honorary Doctorate of Business from Solent University. He is on the Board of Governors for The Royal Academy of Culinary Arts and an active supporter of Action Against Hunger. He is also a regular contributor to The Caterer magazine and campaigner for greater representation in Government for the hospitality sector.

Hutson was appointed an Officer of the Order of the British Empire (OBE) in the 2022 New Year Honours for services to the hospitality industry and philanthropy.

== Personal life ==
Hutson is married to Judy, a former occupational therapist, they have two sons, and live in Winchester, Hampshire.

He enjoys fishing and wine and has completed many cross-continental motorcycle trips.
