= Hotel du Vin, Royal Tunbridge Wells =

Hotel in Kent, England

Hotel du Vin
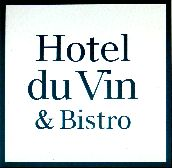

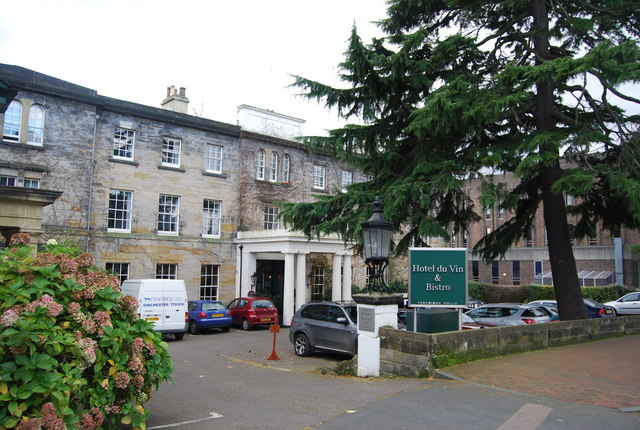

- Location within Kent

General information
- Location: Crescent Road, Royal Tunbridge Wells, Kent, England
- Coordinates: 51°7′54″N 0°15′55″E
- Owner: Hotel du Vin
- Operator: MWB Group Holdings

Other information
- Number of rooms: 36

The Hotel du Vin & Bistro is a hotel in Crescent Road, Royal Tunbridge Wells, Kent, England. It lies in between St Augustine's Catholic Church and Eynshym House. The hotel is part of the Hotel du Vin chain. It is located in a Grade II listed sandstone building dated to 1762 and overlooks Caverley Park. The building was extended in the 1830s by Decimus Burton and contains 36 bedrooms, a billiards room and a boules court as of 2011, although 32 rooms and 1 suite were reported in 2001. John Gielgud was a frequent visitor to the hotel.
