= One Central Park =

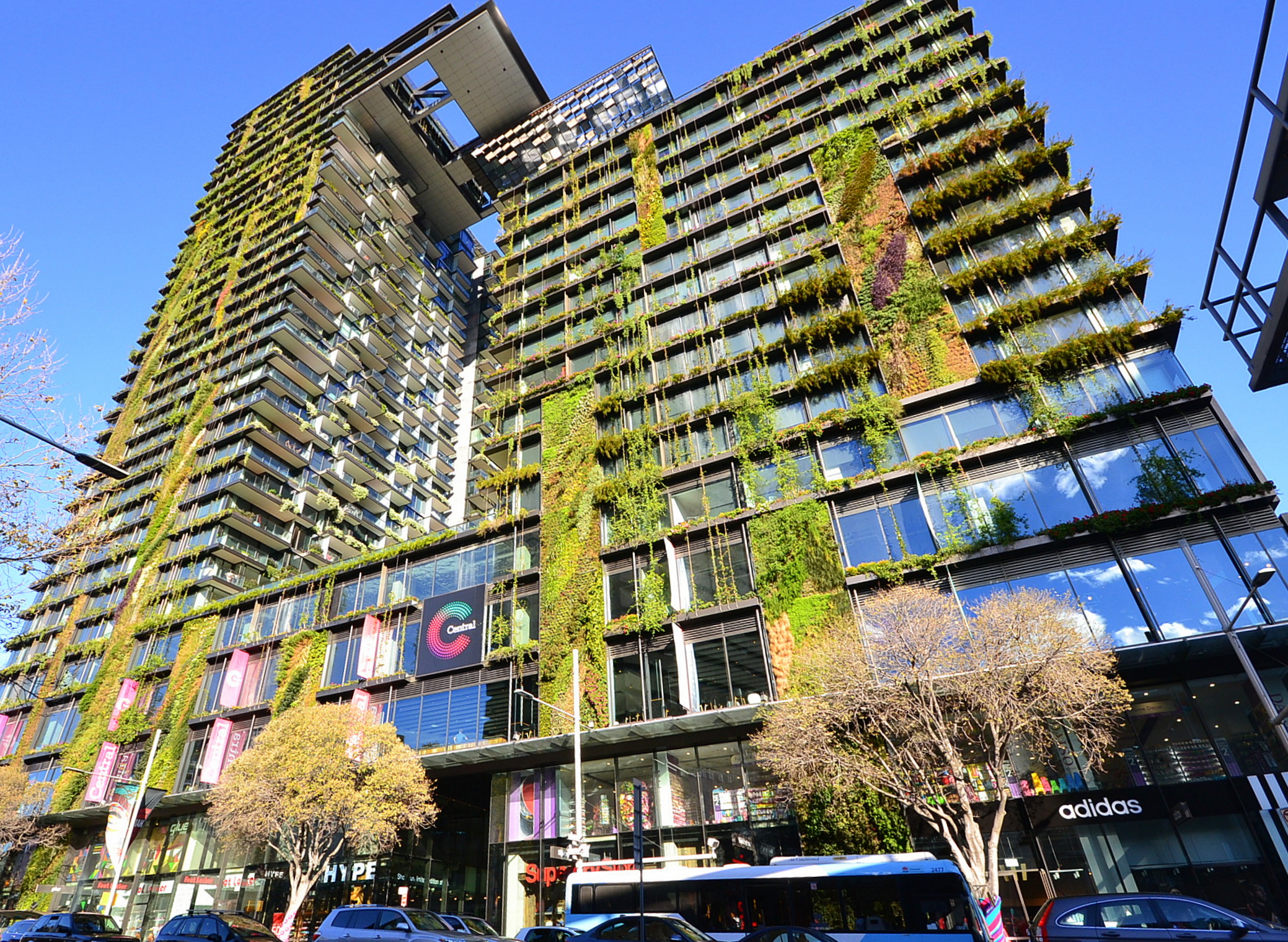
- Interactive map of One Central Park
- Address: 28 Broadway, Chippendale, Sydney (Map)
- Coordinates: 33.8843°S 151.2003°E
- Status: Complete
- Groundbreaking: 2012
- Constructed: 2012–2013
- Opening: December 2013
- Use: Mixed
- Website: www.centralparksydney.com/live/one-central-park

Companies
- Architect: Ateliers Jean Nouvel and PTW Architects
- Structural engineer: Robert Bird Group
- Developer: Frasers Property

Technical details
- Buildings: 2
- Size: 6 hectares (15 acres)

One Central Park is a mixed-use dual skyscraper located in the Sydney suburb of Chippendale in New South Wales, Australia. Developed as a joint venture between Frasers Property and Sekisui House, it was constructed by Besix Watpac as the first stage of the Central Park urban renewal project.

The building itself comprises two residential apartment towers, an east and west tower, in addition to a six level retail shopping centre at the base of the towers. In 2013, One Central Park was awarded a 5 star Green Star – ‘Multi-Unit Residential Design v1’ Certified Rating by the Green Building Council of Australia, making it the largest multi-residential building (by net lettable area) in Australia to receive such a designation.

== History ==
Formerly occupied by Carlton & United Breweries, the site of Central Park was purchased by Frasers Property for $208 million in 2007. When commenting on the acquisition at the time, Fraser Property's chief executive Dr Stanley Quek stated, "What we want is to create a village that people can work and play in. It’s [a place] for people who want to live in Glebe but can’t afford Glebe prices".

Changes in the New South Wales political climate meant the state government was granted approval authority over local councils for developments deemed "state significant projects". Therefore, in 2009 it was the state government of New South Wales that provided approval of an enhanced master scheme of Central Park that was put forth by Paris based firm Ateliers Jean Nouvel and Sydney based firm PTW Architects collaborated to form the Central Park project's architectural team. The new master scheme included a larger floor area, additional open space, trigeneration as well as provisions to ensure the project's buildings could achieve a 5 star green star rating.

In February 2010, construction of the Central Park project's main park, roads and basements commenced. With the One Central Park building operating as the first residential stage of the entire development, its apartments were the first to be released to the public; going on sale in August 2010. One Central Park west tower saw its completion in May 2013 and thus welcomed the very first residents of Central Park. The official opening of One Central Park occurred later that year, in December 2013.

With the completion of One Central Park, the development of the Central Park precinct moved to the next phases of its $2 billion urban village plan. This culminated in the construction of Park Lane in 2013/2014 and The Mark in 2014, the release of Sky at One Central Park (a collection of Penthouses and Sub Penthouses) as well as the provision of student accommodation facilities in 2015. The next residential stage of the Central Park project is Connor.

On 21 February 2014, Fraser Property in conjunction with Sekisui House issued a media release announcing that Central Park had sold apartments worth $1 billion. It was stated that the first three residential stages of Central Park (One Central Park, Park Lane and The Mark) had exchanged contracts worth in excess of 1,300 apartments at an average price of AUD $770,000 per apartment.

== Design ==
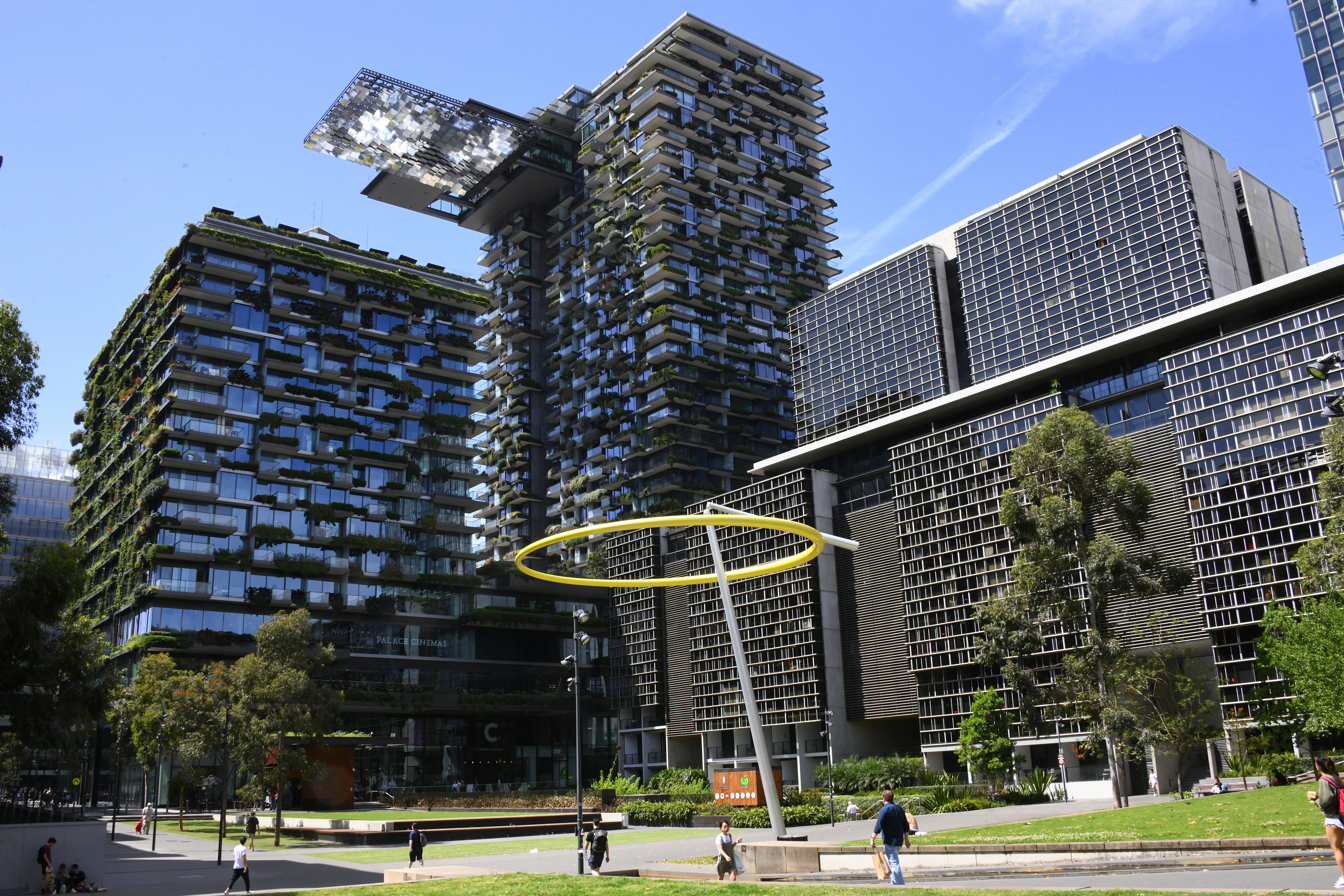
One Central Park in 2019

Built by Besix Watpac, One Central Park is a two-tower complex that forms part of the larger Central Park precinct. The Central Park precinct, which is located on just less than six hectares of land, was designed to allow for the development of approximately 235,000 square metres of residential, commercial and retail space. Initial project forecasts anticipated that around 2,200 residential apartments and 900 student dwellings would be constructed over 3–10 years.

One Central Park is situated on the northeastern corner of the precinct, comprising a total site area of 6,060 square metres. The building itself is made up of 4 below ground levels and 34 above ground floors, allowing for the configuration of 623 apartments in addition to 625 car parking spaces. When measured from the base of the building to its highest point, One Central Park has a height of 117 metres. The gross floor area of the total development is recorded at 255,500 m^{2}. At the foot of the towers is a naturally lit six level retail area, which incorporates a variety of fashion, technology, casual dining, restaurants and entertainment outlets.

Whilst Ateliers Jean Nouvel and PTW Architects worked in collaboration to form the basis of the One Central Park architectural team, two interior architects were separately utilised for the east and west towers. Koichi Takada was commissioned with designing the east tower of One Central Park. He gave the apartments an organic feel that blended the outside foliage and gardens with the wooden interiors. William Smart of Smart Design Studios was appointed to style the west tower. Smart's designs, based on the idea of luxury that comes from high-end sports cars and motor yachts, used sophisticated curves and glossy finishes in the apartments in the west tower.

== Building features ==
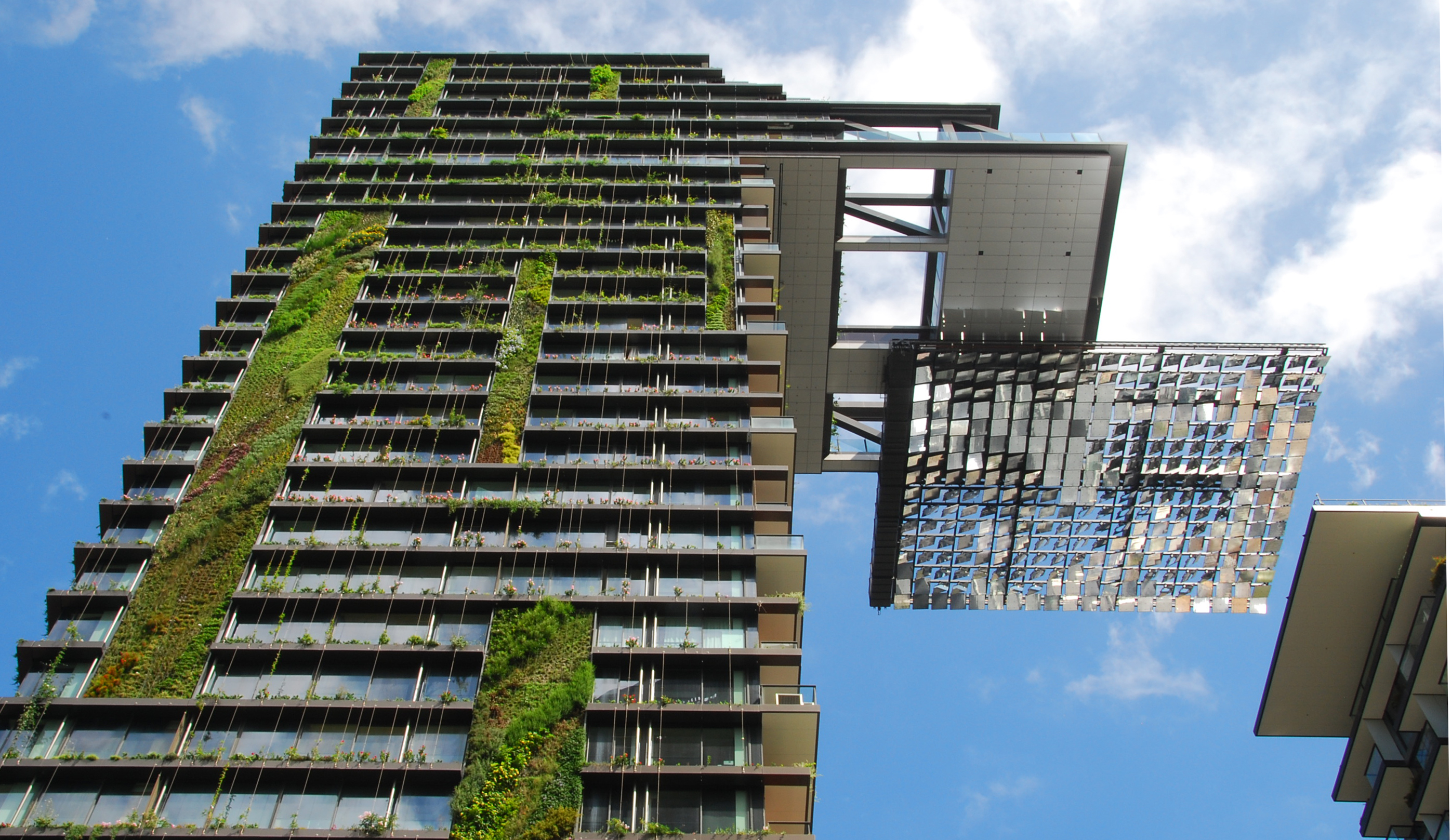
Heliostat at One Central Park

A number of distinct features has allowed One Central Park to be recognised as a unique structure at an international level. Key among them are its vertical hanging gardens, cantilevered heliostat, low carbon tri-generation power plant and internal water recycling plant.

=== Vertical hanging gardens ===
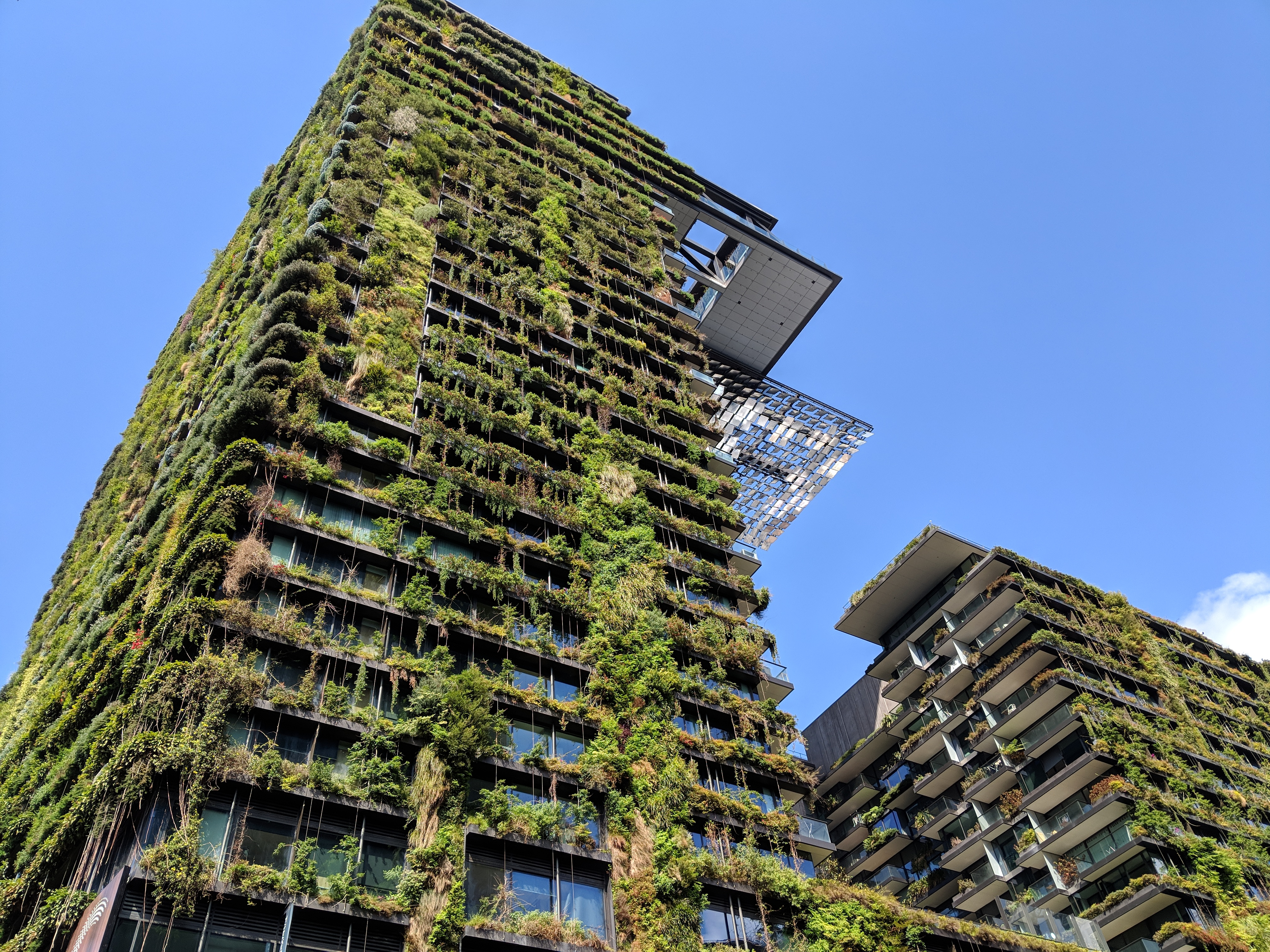
Vertical gardens viewed from Broadway

One Central Park's vertical gardens were inspired by the collaboration of French botanist Patrick Blanc and the architects Ateliers Jean Nouvel with LED art by Yann Kersalé. A living tapestry of plants, flowers and vines which stretch over 50 metres high, it has become the world's tallest vertical garden. During the construction phase of One Central Park, the concept of putting the vertical garden onto the building brought with it a variety of complexities and challenges. As Besix Watpac Construction NSW/ACT State Manager Ric Wang highlighted, "Patrick Blanc’s garden concept is a hydroponic system which in effect hangs off the building, so we had to revise the original façade design and methodology to make it possible". The solution to the problem saw individually designed planter boxes installed which were supported by floor slabs to create the effect of the ‘living wall’ aspect of the façade design. Each horizontal and vertical planter required its own irrigation system, which is centrally managed through a building management system that is able to monitor and account for environmental conditions. Over 35,000 green wall plants were utilised within which 350 different species were selected for the green walls alone. The building houses 23 green walls, equating to a total area of 1, 200m^{2}. In all, 85,000 facade plants make up the vertical gardens of One Central Park. Both exotic and Australian native plants have been included to make up the "living wall", ranging from well known species to those that are deemed rare. Cumulatively, there are over 250 species of Australian plants and flowers in the building. Critical to the success of the vertical gardens was Blanc's insistence that the plants do not need soil to grow provided they have something to attach to. Light, carbon dioxide water and nutrients are dispersed mechanically to the plants in order to stimulate their growth and survival. By having the vertical garden hang off the wall without soil it is possible for the plants to grow without compromising the structural integrity of the building.

Sydney living infrastructure specialists Junglefy worked with botanist Blanc and construction company Besix Watpac to deliver the green walls. They were responsible for maintenance of the plants up until August 2021.

=== Cantilevered heliostat ===
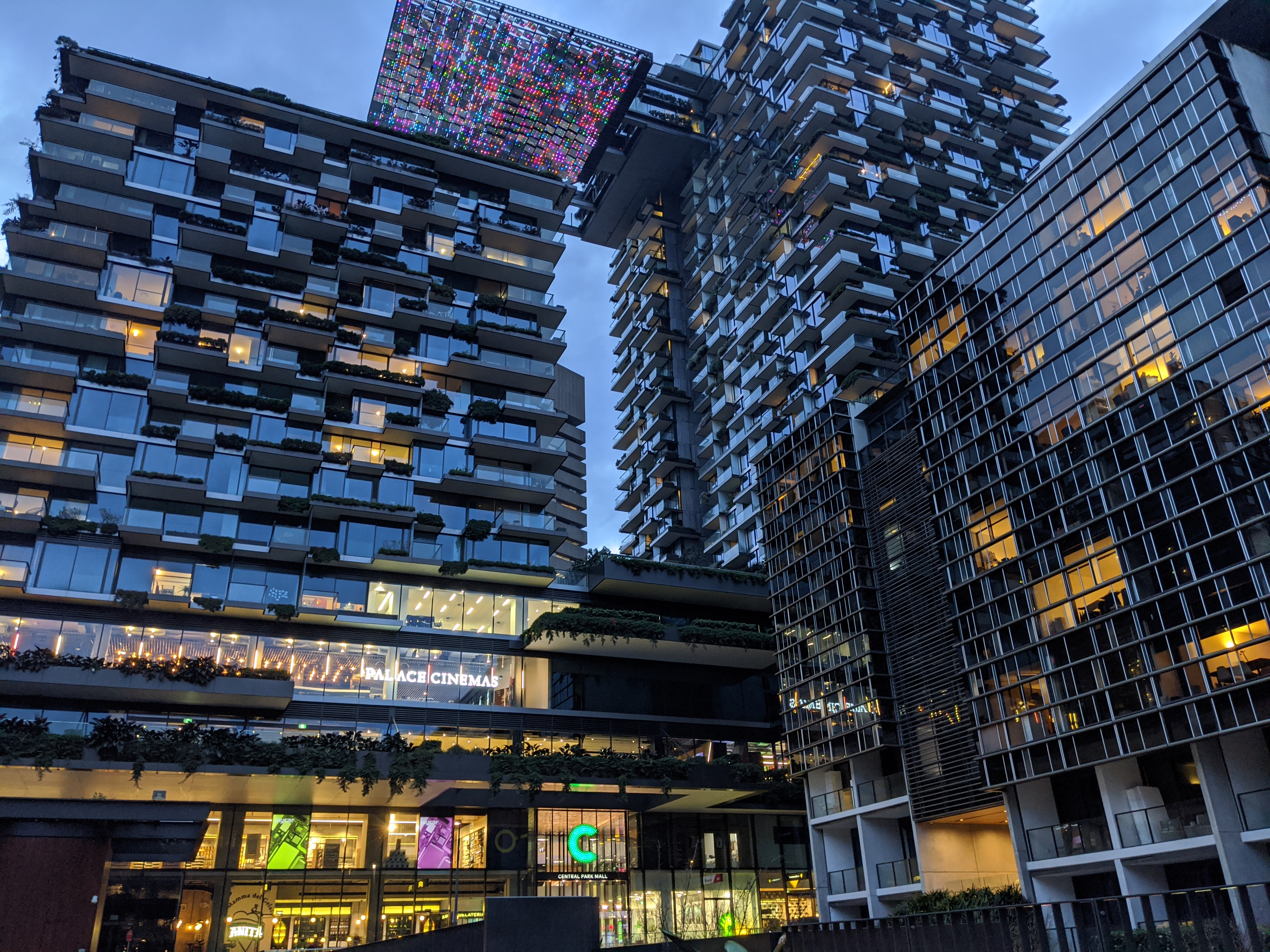
The cantilevered heliostat of One Central Park is attached to the eastern tower of the complex.

Central Park's cantilevered heliostat figures as another defining feature of the building. Suspended from the 28th floor of One Central Park's east tower, it serves not only as a predominant design element to the building but as a way of reflecting light to the gardens and atrium below. It operates through a series of motorised mirrors that are positioned 100 metres below the cantilever on the rooftop of the west tower. Daylight is automatically tracked from these mirrors and the light is reflected up to the cantilever. 220 fixed reflecting panels are positioned across the underbelly of the cantilever and are able to then bounce light throughout the retail atrium, pedestrian corridor, pool terrace and communal areas. On the upper side of the cantilever a sky garden has been erected. At night the cantilever is transformed into an LED light display through the work of international lighting artist Yann Kersalé.

=== Sustainable initiatives ===
At the core of Central Park is a commitment to sustainability and self-sufficiency, which is reflected in two measures incorporated in the precinct: a low carbon tri generation power plant and an internal water recycling plant.

Central Park is projected to utilise its own low-carbon natural gas power plant, which shall allow for thermal energy to be produced for both residents and employees. The first stage of this measure involves a two megawatt tri generation energy plant which, when completed in November 2015, will run on natural gas and have the capacity to produce carbon thermal energy, heating and cooling for 3000 residences and 65,000 square metres of retail and commercial space. Tri generation is believed to be twice as efficient as coal fired power plants and it is forecasted that Central Parks’ trigeneration energy plant could reduce greenhouse gas emissions by as much as 190,000 tonnes over the 25-year design life of the plant.

Central park's recycled water network houses the world's biggest membrane bioreactor recycled water facility in the basement of the residential building. It is designed to service approximately 4,000 residents and more than 15,000 visitors and workers daily. The recycled water network has the capacity to harness multiple water sources with varying qualities and create a multitude of water supplies, which cover all the water requirements of the community. Water sources include:

- Rainwater from roofs
- Storm water from impermeable surfaces/planter box drainage
- Groundwater from basement drainage systems
- Sewage from an adjacent public sewer
- Sewage from all buildings within the Central Park community
- Irrigation water from all green walls
- Drinking water from the public water main.

== Amenities ==
The One Central Park building provides a number of amenities not only for its own residents but for those that occupy two of the other buildings in the Central Park precinct, Park Lane and The Mark. The first of which is a private 280-square metre gymnasium located on level 4 of the retail mall. It is for the exclusive use of Central Park residents and features a variety of commercial grade equipment. Additionally, a pool terrace is also provided in the open-air podium between the East and West towers. It features a 20-metre outdoor heated pool and spa, shaded seating and a soft lawn. One Central Park also offers a lobby for both the East and West towers in addition to a 24/7 concierge service.

== Sky at One Central Park ==
Upon their completion in January 2014, One Central Park released an assortment of single level sub-penthouses and dual level penthouses apartments under the name "Sky at One Central Park". Located on the top five levels of the east tower above the cantilever, Sky at One Central Park comprises 38 exclusive residences with panoramic views of the city skyline, the Blue Mountains, the eastern suburbs and Botany Bay.

The collection of sub-penthouse apartments range in size from 127 to 161 square metres and upon market offering were priced between AUD $1.68 million to AUD $2.575 million. Penthouse apartments range in size from 158 to 207 square metres and upon market offering were priced between AUD $2.65 million to AUD $3 million.

== Central Park Mall ==
Central Park Mall
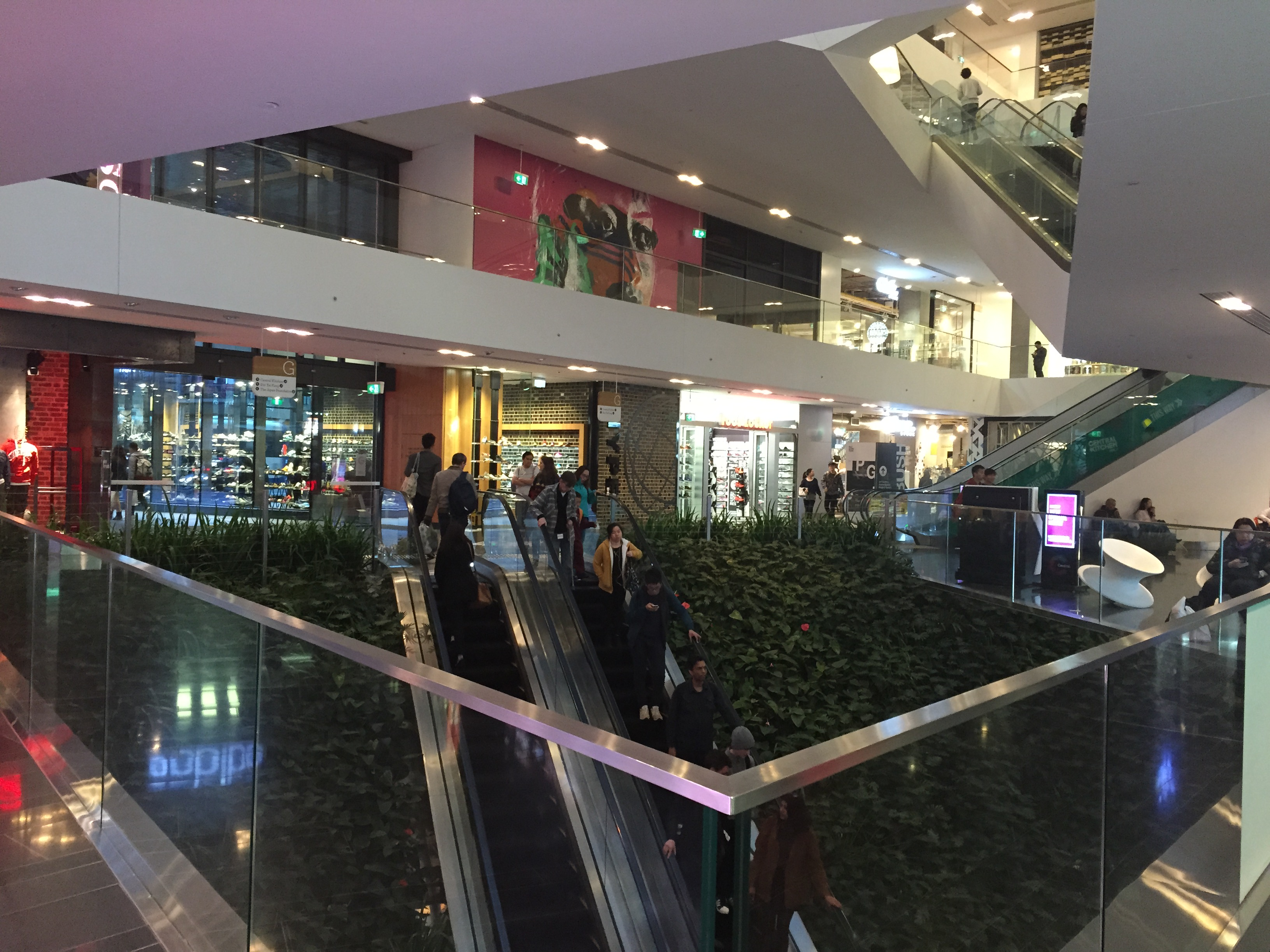
- Interior of Central Park Mall
- Location: Chippendale, New South Wales, Australia
- Address: 28 Broadway, Chippendale NSW 2008
- Opened: December 2013; 12 years ago
- Manager: Fortius Funds Management
- Owner: Fortius Funds Management (50%); SC Capital Partners Group (50%)
- Num. of stores: 45
- Num. of anchor tenants: 2
- Floor area: 14,600 m^{2} (157,153 sq ft)
- Floors: 5
- Public transit: Central railway station
- Website: www.centralparkmall.com.au

Central Park Mall is a shopping centre on the first three levels of One Central Park. The centre features Woolworths, Timezone, Palace Cinemas and over 40 speciality stores. Central Park Mall is part of the 5.8-hectare (14-acre) site, bordered by Broadway to the north, Kensington Street to the east and Abercrombie Street to the west, the broader Central Park precinct is also home to strip and laneway retail across Park Lane and DUO.

Central Park Mall opened in December 2012 and featured Woolworths and up to 40 speciality stores. On 23 November 2017 Palace Cinemas opened a 13 screen cinema on level 3 on the space previously occupied by the aMbush Gallery. Timezone opened its 10th new store at Central Park Mall on 4 May 2018.

In October 2019 Frasers Property Australia and Sekisui House Australia sold the three retail precincts including Central Park Mall to Fortius Funds Management and SC Capital Partners Group on behalf of its RECAP V Fund, for $174.5 million.

== Awards ==
One Central Park has received numerous accolades and awards that have recognised both its structural ingenuity and sustainability measures.

In 2014, the more noteworthy awards included:

- Winner of the Sustainability Award from LEAF Awards 2014 (global)
- Overall Winner of the LEAF Awards 2014 (global)
- Winner of the Best Cogeneration or District Energy Project from the Energy Efficiency Council 2014 (national)
- Winner of the International Green Infrastructure Award from World Green Infrastructure Congress 2014 (global)
- Winner of the Best Tall Building Worldwide from the Council for Tall Building and Urban Habitat (global).

In 2015, some of the more prominent awards it achieved included:

- Winner of the Best Interior Fitout Award from ASOFIA 2014/15 Interior Fitout Awards (national)
- Winner of the High-Density Development by 2015 UDIA National Awards and Winner of the Best Innovative Green Building (global) from MIPIM Awards 2015.

== Controversy ==
In February 2015, an article was published citing that a number of issues encountered by residents at One Central Park had led them to consider legal action. Concerns were raised regarding matters involving prostitution being offered in a number of apartments, the accessibility of the private gym to non-residents (reference was made to an incident where a resident was physically attacked), the vulnerability of the terrace pool to high winds and debris, flooding and leakages in the car park in addition to problems with the gym's roof due to poor electrical work resulting in burn marks and the fiberglass insulation being exposed.

In response to the matters, joint developers Fraser Property and Sekisui House were quoted in the article addressing a variety of these issues. The developers offered further explanation as to why the above incidents had occurred and in some cases highlighted the action being taken to help rectify them.

In July 2019 it was reported that One Central Park in Sydney is on the list of buildings requiring flammable cladding to be replaced.

== See also ==
- Architecture of Sydney
- List of tallest buildings and structures in Sydney
