= Malmaison (hotel chain) =

British hotel chain

Malmaison Trading Ltd.
- Trade name: Malmaison Hotels
- Native name: Malmaison
- Type: Private
- Industry: Hospitality
- Founded: 1994 in Edinburgh, Scotland, UK
- Founder: Ken McCulloch
- Headquarters: London, England, UK
- Number of locations: 18 (2026)
- Area served: United Kingdom
- Key people: Gustaaf Bakker (Director)
- Brands: Chez Mal
- Parent: Frasers Hospitality UK Holdings
- Website: www.malmaison.com

Malmaison is a hotel company that is based in London, England. The company was established in 1994, and is currently owned by Frasers Property.

== History ==
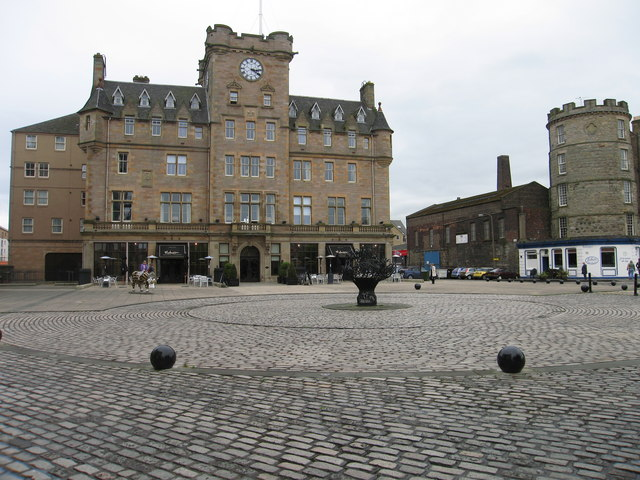
Malmaison Edinburgh was the first hotel in the chain to open

Malmaison was founded by Scottish hotelier Ken McCulloch in 1994 in collaboration with hotel group Arcadian International. The first hotel opened in Leith are of Edinburgh, with a second opening in Glasgow a month later. The chain is named after the Château de Malmaison located in Rueil-Malmaison on the outskirts of Paris, which inspired the design and style found within its hotels.

Malmaison owner MWB Group went into administration in November 2012. US private equity firm KSL Capital Partners purchased Malmaison for an estimated £180 million in March 2013. Under KSL ownership a hotel was opened in Dundee.

In May 2014 Malmaison stopped serving foie gras in their hotel restaurants, after a campaign by animal rights group PETA.

In January 2015, under guidance from investment bank UBS, KSL sought prospective buyers for Malmaison and the Hotel du Vin chain (HDV). Private equity firms Terra Firma Capital Partners and TDR Capital were identified by Sky News in March 2015 as being two of three bidders for the chain. Four months later, in June 2015, the chain along with Hotel du Vin was sold to Frasers Hospitality of Frasers Property Group for £363.4 million.

== Hotels ==
Malmaison hotels are mainly located in city centres. Each hotel typically has between 70 and 200 rooms, a bar and brasserie (branded as Chez Mal), private dining rooms and meeting rooms. Some hotels also have a champagne bar, a number have gyms and three have a spa.

The chain has sixteen hotels, fifteen of which are converted historic buildings, including a prison, a postal sorting office, a church and a building once used as a brothel. As of January 2017, Malmaison's only new-build hotel is located in Liverpool.

== Controversies ==
Malmaison was subject of protests in February 2017 when wedding fairs at their London and Liverpool hotels were targeted by trade union Unite. The union accused the hotel chain of low pay, long hours, unfair tipping practices, health and safety breaches and alleged management bullying. In response Malmaison stated that "It operates a fair, transparent policy regarding all aspects of remuneration. All employees, regardless of age requirements, are paid at least the National Living Wage. Additionally, it is the rule that 100% of the service charge received is paid out to food and beverage employees and any breach of this will be thoroughly investigated."
