= One Devonshire Gardens =

Hotel in Glasgow, Scotland

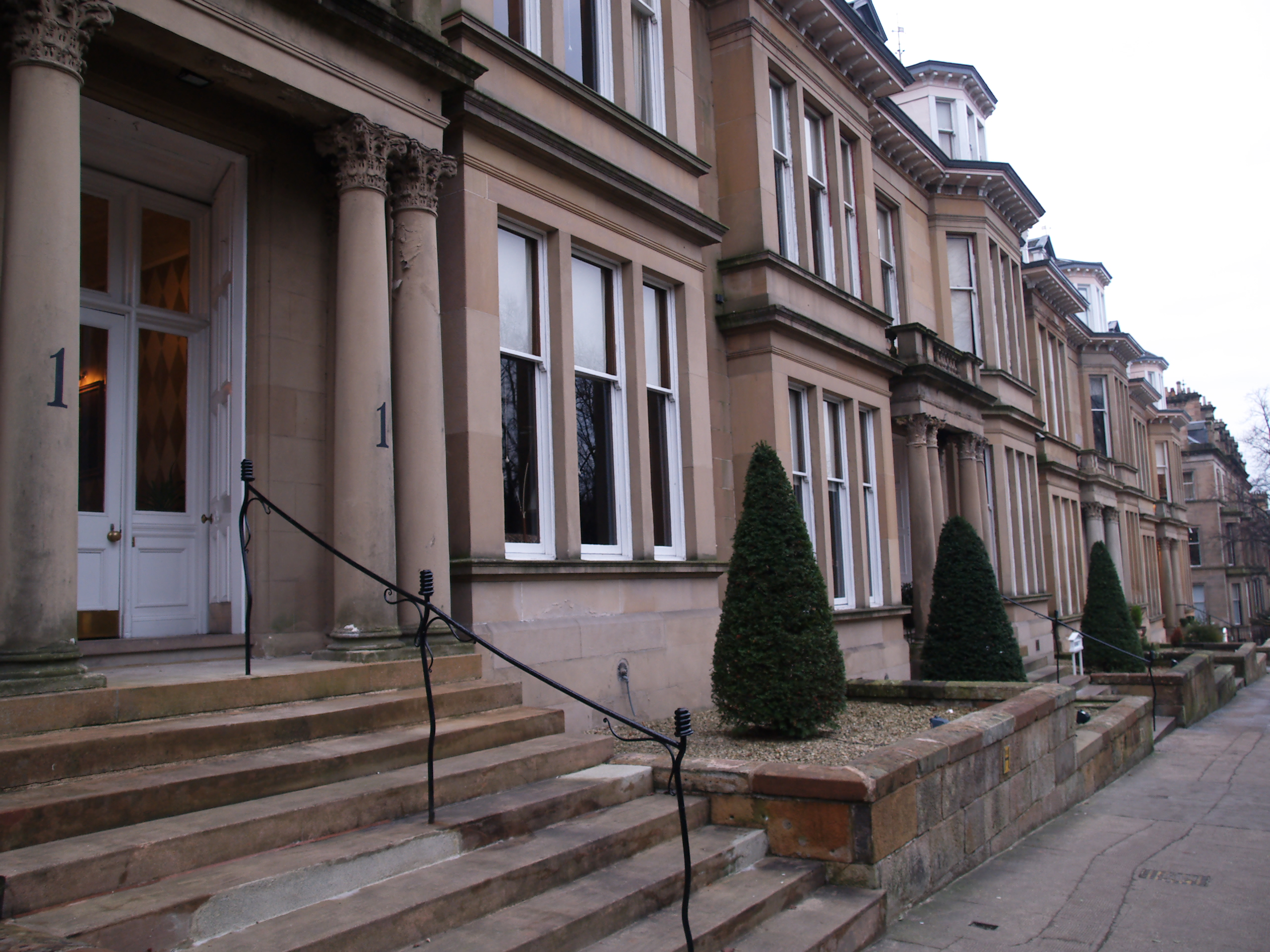
- One Devonshire Gardens in 2006
- Interactive map of the One Devonshire Gardens area

General information
- Location: Glasgow
- Coordinates: 55.8825°N 4.3045°W
- Opening: 1986
- Owner: Hotel du Vin

Technical details
- Floor count: 3

Other information
- Number of rooms: 49
- Parking: On-street

Website
- www.hotelduvin.com/glasgow

One Devonshire Gardens (officially known as Hotel du Vin at One Devonshire Gardens) is a luxury hotel located in the West End of Glasgow, Scotland. The hotel holds a licence as a marriage venue.

== History ==
Devonshire Gardens is a B-listed terrace of five townhouses, constructed in the 1870s. The hotel was opened by Ken McCulloch in 1986 in Number One, although it has since expanded to occupy all five houses, Number Four being the last acquired. The hotel now has forty-nine bedrooms, and in 2006 was acquired by the Hotel du Vin chain, which also operates Malmaison hotels. Celebrity chef Gordon Ramsay ran the hotel's restaurant, Amarylis, from 2002 until 2004.

== Awards ==
- Fine Dining Restaurant of the Year – Scottish Restaurant Awards 2009
- Glasgow Hotel of the Year – Scottish Hotel of the Year Awards 2008
- Scottish National Hotel Chef of the Year – Scottish Hotel of the Year Awards 2008

== See also ==
- Glasgow International Hilton Hotel
