= Gerard Basset =

English sommelier (1957–2019)

Gerard Francis Claude Basset OBE, MS, MW, MBA, OIV MSc (7 March 1957 – 16 January 2019) was the owner of Hotel TerraVina, a New Forest Hotel near Southampton in Hampshire, United Kingdom. At the time of his death, he was the only person in the world to hold the combined titles of Master of Wine, Master Sommelier, Wine MBA, OIV MSc in Wine Management and World's Best Sommelier.

== Early life and education ==
Basset was born in the industrial city of St Étienne. His parents were Marguerite (née Conorton), a midwife, and Pierre-René Basset, a draughtsman.

== Career ==
In 1989 Bassett qualified as a Master Sommelier, and in 1998 as a Master of Wine. In 1992, he also won Best International Sommelier for French Wines (Paris) and four years later he went on to win The Best Sommelier of Europe (1996). He was subsequently ranked in 2nd place in the World's Best Sommelier Competition on three occasions, until he won the title upon his sixth attempt in 2010.

In 1994 Basset co-founded Hotel du Vin with partner Robin Hutson, by opening their first hotel in Winchester. The chain grew to six hotels before selling to MWB Group in October 2004. In 2007, Basset opened Hotel TerraVina in the New Forest near Southampton with his wife Nina. Hotel TerraVina closed at the end of February 2018 and reopened on 5 March as kitchen café, deli and boutique B&B, Spot in the Woods.

== Personal life ==
Basset and his wife Nina had a son. Basset died of cancer aged 61.

== Awards and honours ==
Basset was appointed Officer of the Order of the British Empire (OBE) in the 2011 Birthday Honours for services to the hospitality industry, and selected as the Decanter 2013 Man of the Year.

Basset served as President of the Court of Master Sommeliers (Europe) and in 2014 was appointed Honorary President of the Wine and Spirit Education Trust, which he held for three years.

In January 2018, Basset was awarded the Ordre du Mérite Agricole by the French ambassador to the UK for his work in supporting the French wine industry.

== See also ==
- List of wine personalities
