= Hotel du Vin =

British hotel chain

Hotel Du Vin Trading Limited
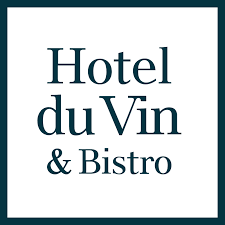
- Trade name: Hotel Du Vin
- Industry: Hotel
- Founded: 1994
- Founder: Gerard Basset; Robin Hutson
- Headquarters: London, England, UK
- Number of locations: 19 (2019)
- Area served: United Kingdom
- Parent: Frasers Hospitality
- Website: www.hotelduvin.com

Hotel du Vin is a boutique hotel chain based in London, England, that operates hotels in the United Kingdom.

== History ==
The hotel chain was founded in Winchester in 1994 by Gerard Basset and Robin Hutson, who had both previously worked at Chewton Glen hotel where Basset was the head sommelier and Hutson the managing director. The name "Hotel du Vin" was a reference to Basset's wine expertise. At the time Basset was a Master Sommelier; he went on to become a Master of Wine (1998). KSL Capital Partners purchased the Hotel du Vin chain and the Malmaison hotel chain early in 2013, before selling both hotel brands to Frasers Hospitality for £363m in 2015.

== Locations ==
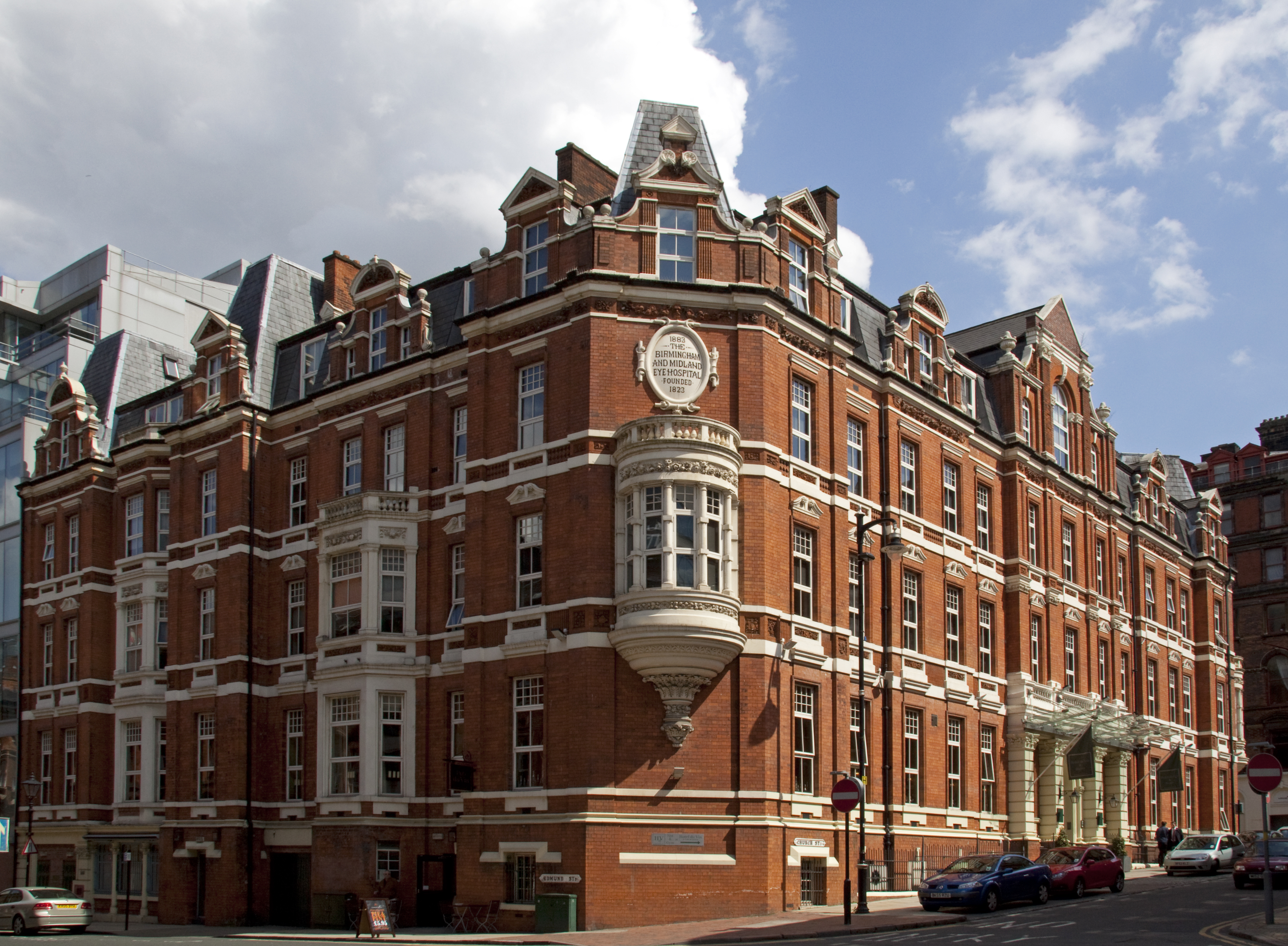
Hotel du Vin in Birmingham

Subsequent hotels were established in other locations including Birmingham, Brighton, Bristol Avon Gorge, Bristol City Centre, Cambridge, Cheltenham, Edinburgh, Exeter, Glasgow, Harrogate, Henley-on-Thames, Newcastle, Poole, St Andrews, Stratford Upon Avon, Tunbridge Wells, Wimbledon, Winchester and York. As of 2019, Hotel du Vin were operating nineteen hotels across the UK, primarily in university locations and cathedral cities.

Plans have been submitted in 2019 to convert Pearl Assurance House into a 70 bedroom site in Manchester which will also feature a rooftop bar.
