= Halo (sculpture) =

Kinetic sculpture in Sydney, Australia

Coordinates: 33°53′8.201″S 151°12′1.045″E

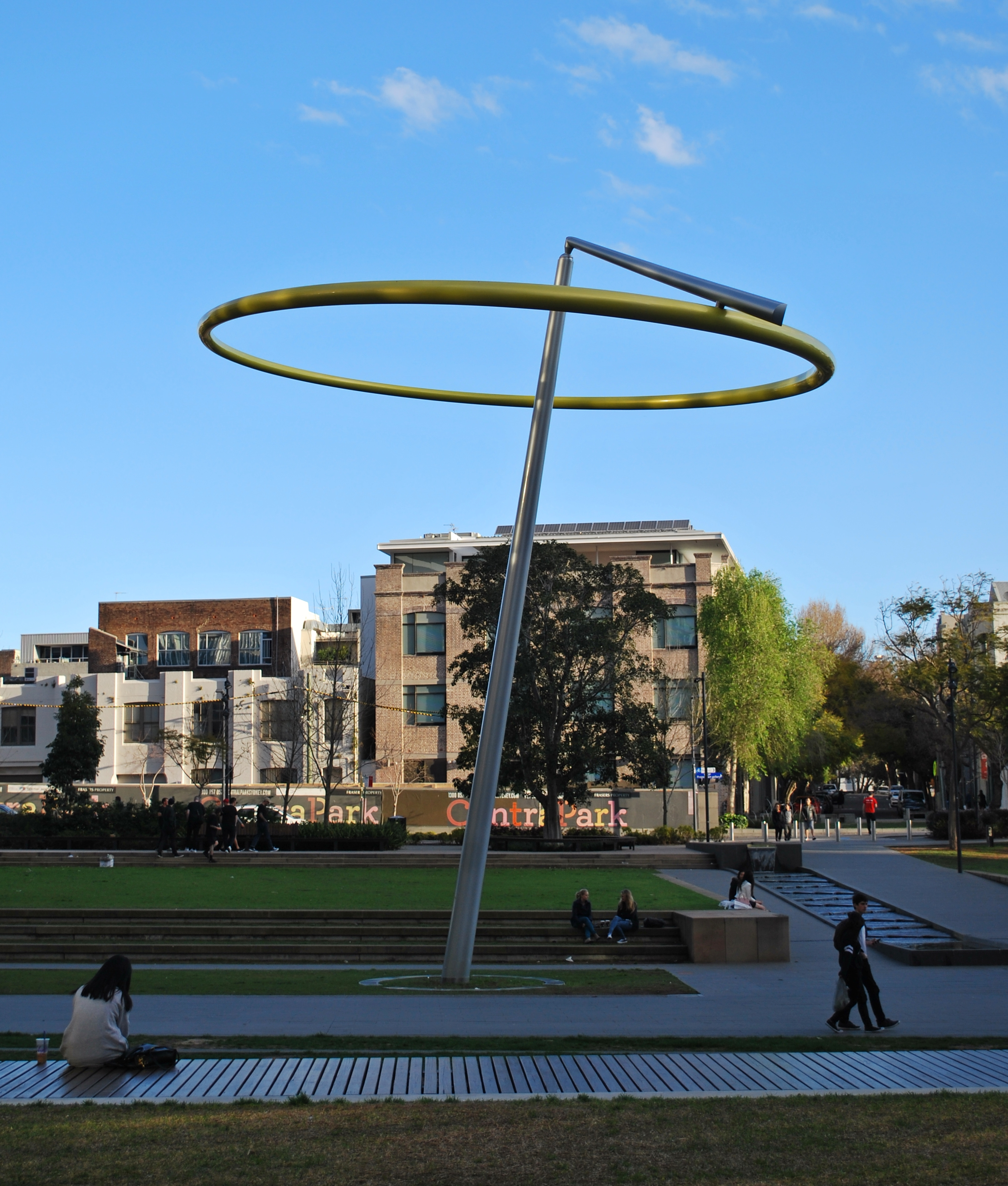
- Artist: Turpin + Crawford Studio
- Year: 2012
- Type: Kinetic sculpture
- Dimensions: 13 m × 12 m × 12 m (43 ft × 39 ft × 39 ft)
- Location: Chippendale Green; Chippendale, Sydney, New South Wales

Halo is a wind powered kinetic sculpture in Sydney, Australia. Located at Central Park, the artwork is part of a major mixed-use urban renewal project to redevelop the old Kent Brewery site in Broadway.

It was designed by artists Jennifer Turpin and Michaelie Crawford of Turpin + Crawford Studio while engineering firm, Partridge, was responsible for the delivery.

The sculpture consists of a 12-metre diameter tapered yellow ring held by a 6-metre-long (20 ft) silver cantilevered arm pivoting off-centre atop a 13-metre-high (43 ft) angled silver mast. The arm also serves as a sail, allowing the ring to turn and tilts in response to live winds.

Commissioned by the developers of Central Park in collaboration with the local government, Halo was officially opened on 14 August 2012 and has since been donated to the City of Sydney as part of its City Art Collection.

== Design ==
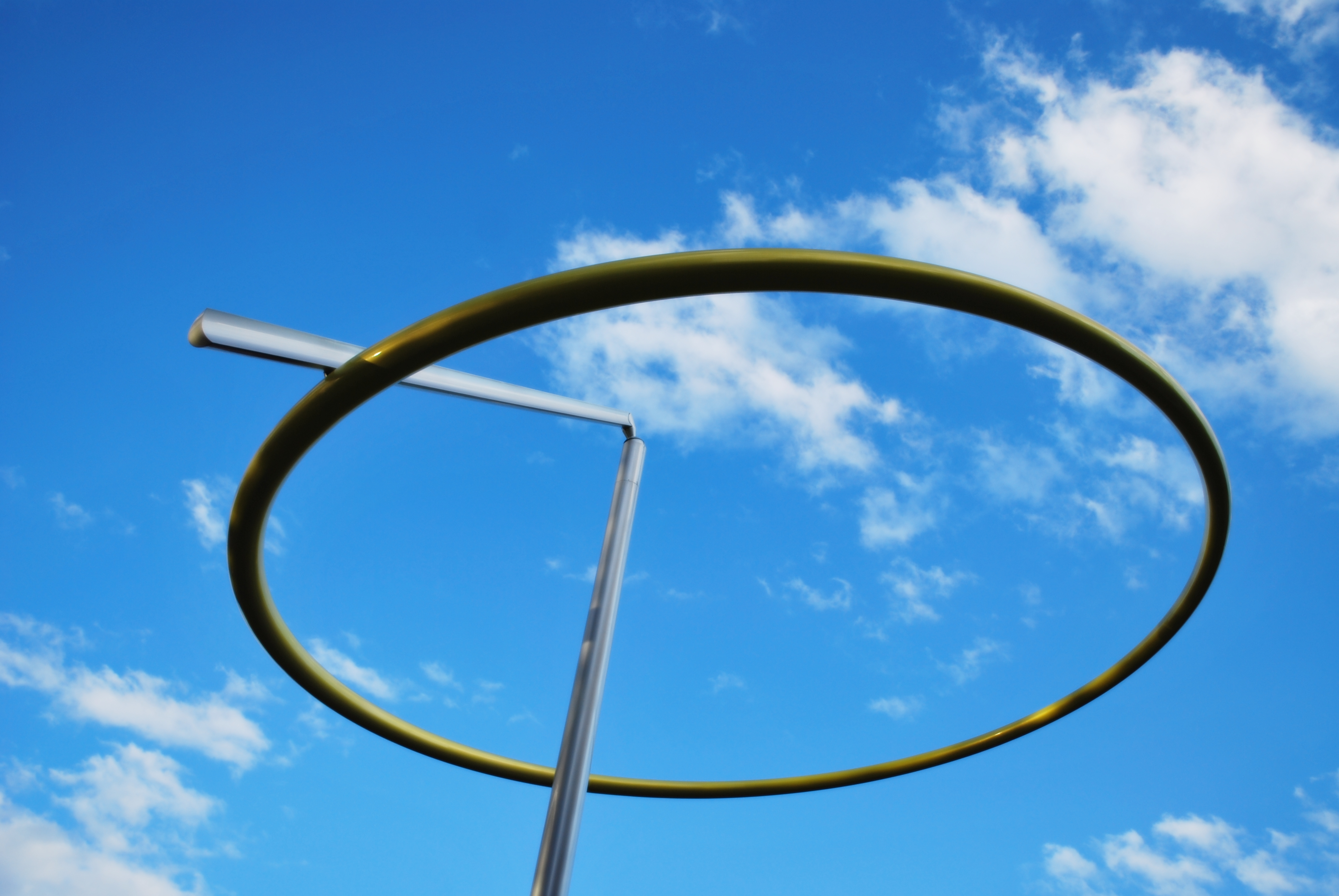
The ring and arm of Halo pivoting off-centre atop angled mast

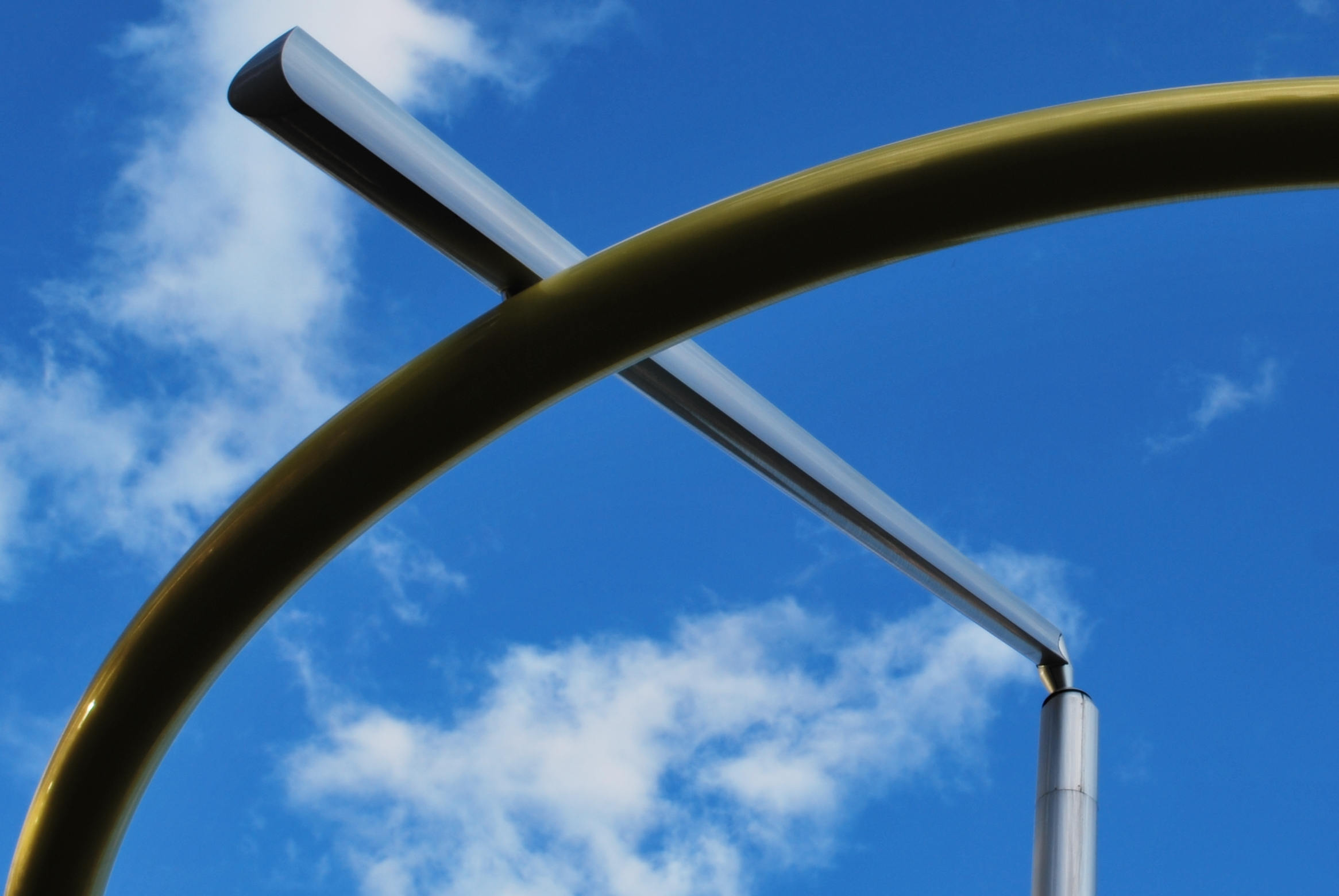
Halo (detail)

=== Concept ===
Halo draws inspiration from the site's rich brewery heritage. The sculptural form of Halo is a reference to the enormous circular brewing-vat support found in the decommissioned Brewery Yard building, while the off-centered encircling motion of the ring is the re-imagination of stirrings of brewing alchemy and the tipsy effects of alcohol.

The minimalist design, together with its wind driven motion, are intended to provide a calm setting against the hectic activity of the highly urbanised environment, exemplifying Turpin + Crawford Studio's philosophy to create works which are "collaborations with nature".

=== Engineering ===
The components were made of carbon fibre joined together by stainless-steel connections. As the ring's turning speed and tilting angle are dependent on wind force, detailed finite element analysis and wind tunnel tests were carried out to enable the minimum use of materials and fixtures to provide a stiff and stable structure in real wind conditions.

Mechanical engineer, Arran Gordon of Partridge, designed a bearing unit that uses a 12mm diameter partially stabilised zirconia ceramic ball to deliver an almost frictionless encircling motion while balancing the entire weight of the ring and arm, allowing the sculpture to pick up and create swaying momentum in winds as low as 2 km/h. The unit has a capacity designed for extreme weather conditions, with brakes in place to absorb and dampen the motion at higher revolutions and degrees of pitch.

=== Finishes ===
Reflective pearlised glaze has been applied to the components of the sculpture to give a glistening glow of its surfaces after extensive research and testing with a specialist colour consultant.

== Construction ==
Halo kinetic movement (time lapse video)

The carbon fibre ring and arm were fabricated and painted at a boat building yard in Nowra. Full scale assembly and wind tests were also conducted at the yard before being disassembled for easy transportation.

The three separated pieces of the ring were then reassembled and connected to the arm and bearing assembly. Finally, the assembled parts were lifted onto its mast.

After three years in research, design and construction since its original conception, Halo was finally completed in July 2012 and was formally opened on 19 August 2012. The cost for the sculpture was $1.3 million and was funded by the developers of Central Park, Frasers Property Australia and Sekisui House Australia, in collaboration with the City of Sydney.

== Awards ==
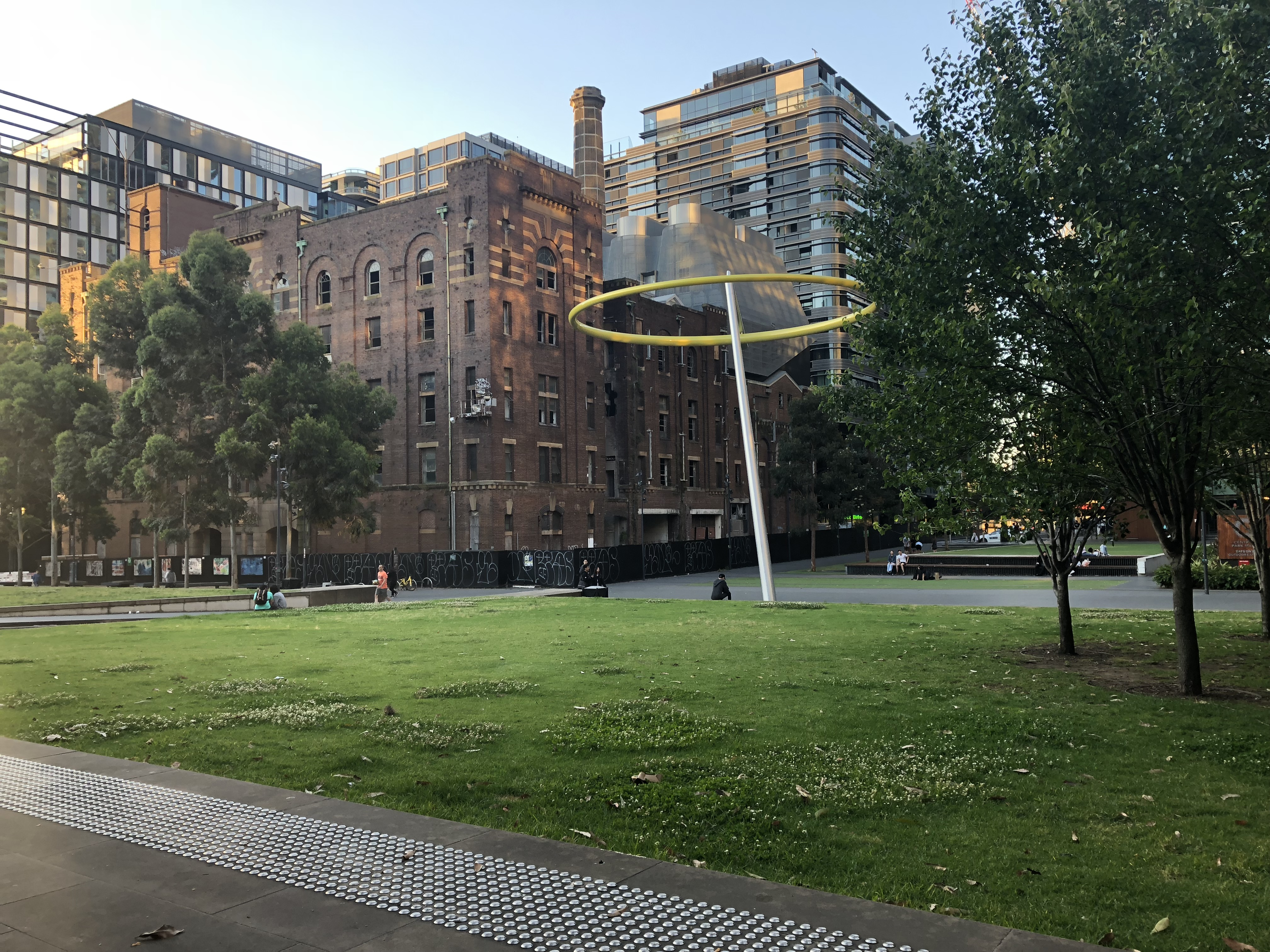
Halo viewed from O'Connor street, with the Chippendale Green in the foreground

The Institution of Engineers Australia recognized Halo and Partridge with the President's Award at the 2012 Engineering Excellence Awards Sydney for their innovative techniques in management, design and fabrication.

== See also ==
- She Changes, a public sculpture in Porto
- Zephyrometer, an installation along the Meridian Energy Wind Sculpture Walk in Wellington
- Singing Ringing Tree, a wind-powered musical sculpture in Burnley
