= Central Park, Sydney =

Urban precinct in Sydney, Australia

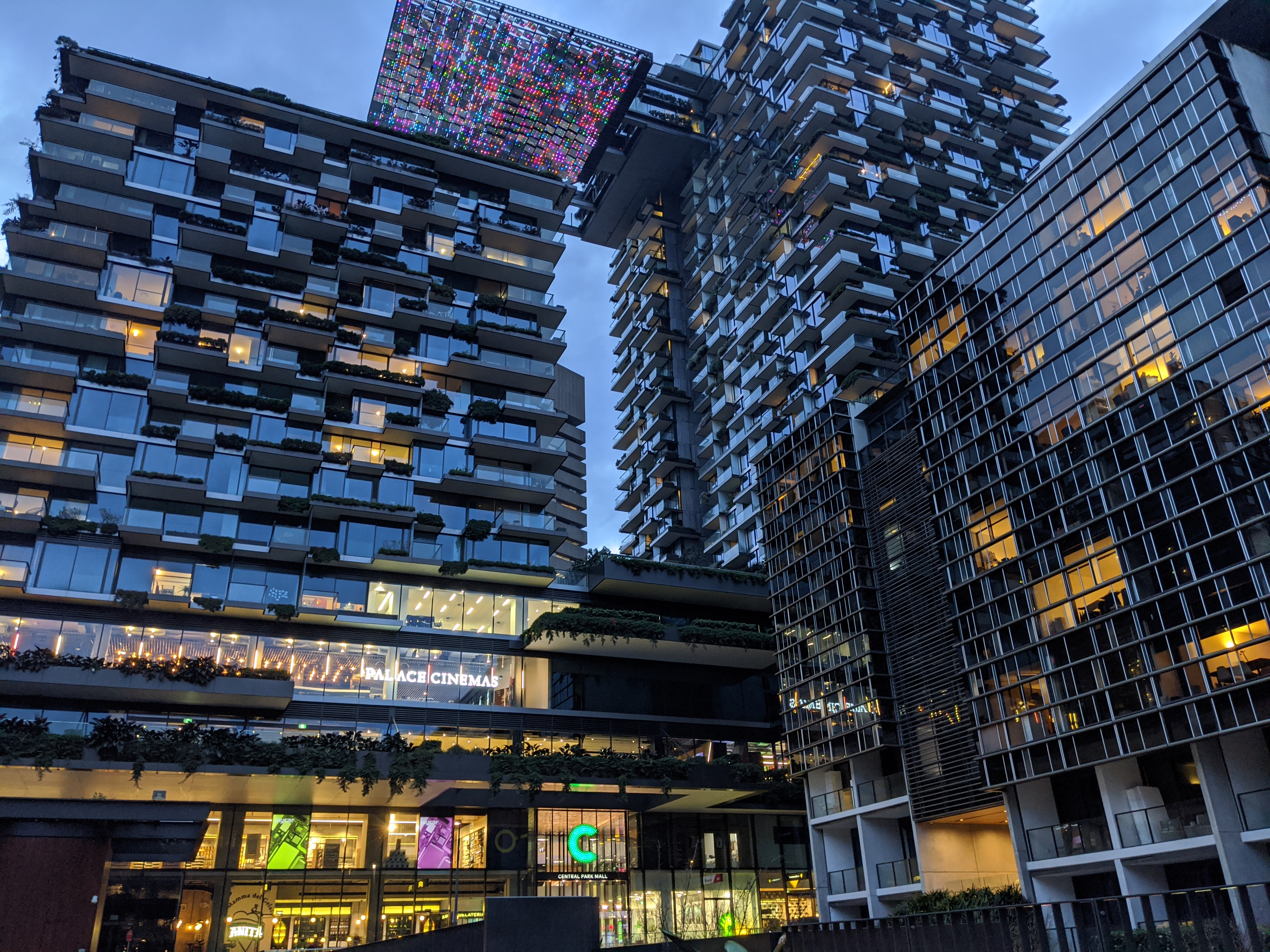
One Central Park as viewed from the park below.

Central Park is a major mixed-use urban renewal project in Sydney, New South Wales, Australia located on Broadway in the suburb of Chippendale. The development is focused on a new public park located just off Broadway of approximately 6,500 square metres (70,000 sq ft) in size. For many decades the southern side of Broadway was dominated by a brewery, which closed in the 2000s and the site was put up for sale. Frasers Property purchased the site from the Foster's Group on 29 June 2007. On a difficult site, the design fitted the towers around the streets, created new public spaces and connections to the city, added 30,000 specially selected plants, included art work, and incorporated pedestrian as well as vehicular access.

The project includes the award-winning high-rise building One Central Park, an apartment complex known for its hanging vertical gardens.

== Precincts ==
The entire Central Park project site covered 15 hectares (37 acres) on Broadway. It is a redeveloped industrial site, with boundaries at O'Connor Street, Carlton Street, Broadway and Chippendale Way. The Central Park redevelopment delivered 1,426 apartments and total gross floor area (GFA) of over 150,000 square metres (1,600,000 sq ft), which GFA for The Mark is 24,000 square metres (260,000 sq ft).

=== One Central Park ===
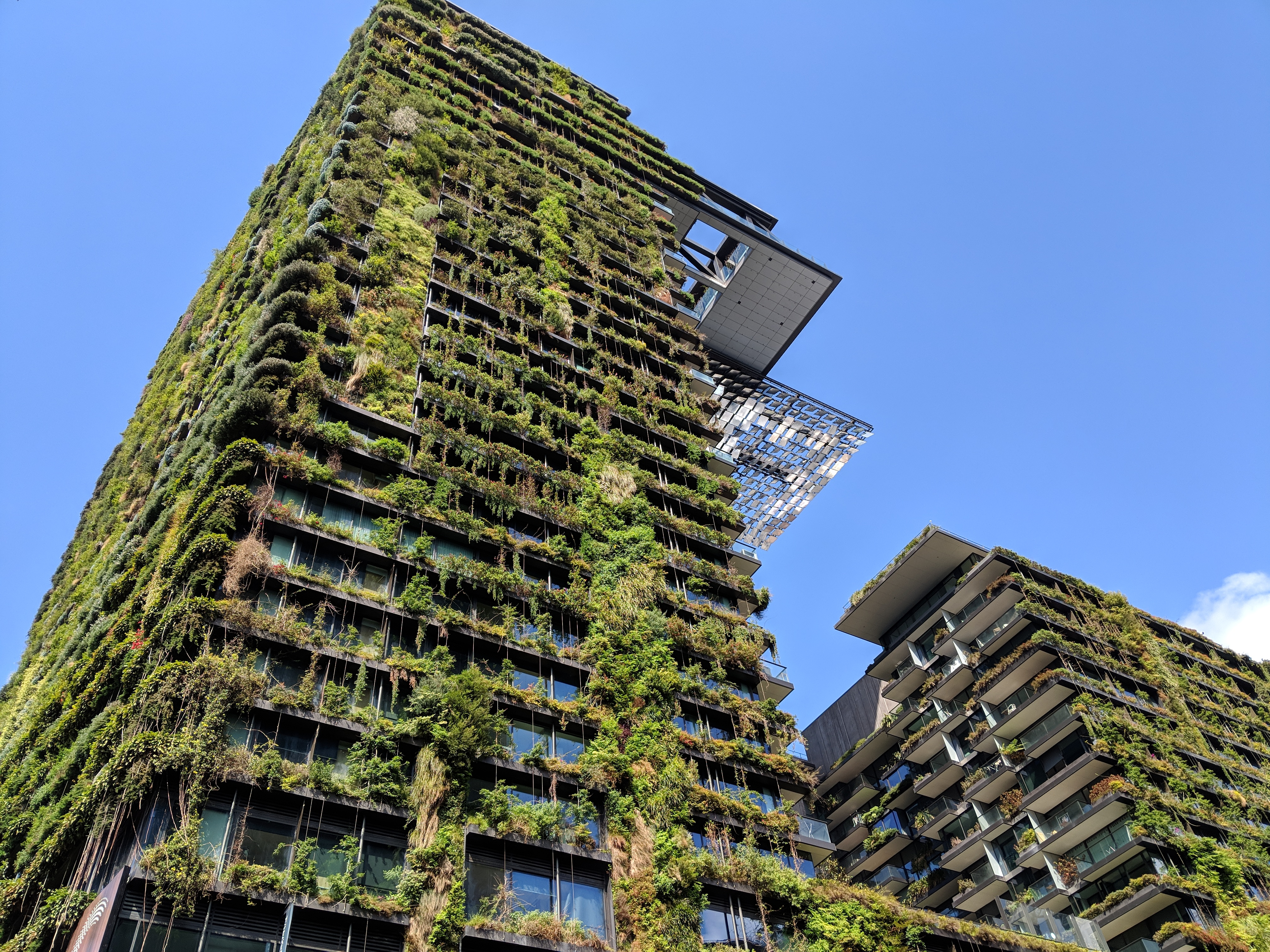
One Central Park.

The first stage of the redevelopment is a tower called One Central Park, a 117-metre-tall (384 ft) residential tower designed by Jean Nouvel featuring vertical gardens by Patrick Blanc and LED art by Yann Kersalé. Located opposite the UTS Tower, One Central Park is an apartment complex with a shopping centre called Central Park Mall located on the lower levels. The design includes a cantilevered section including a heliostat to provide light to the parkland below. It is the tallest building on the site. Construction by Watpac Construction was completed in October 2013.

In May 2014, the One Central Park East tower was ranked by Emporis as one of the world's best skyscrapers. In July of the same year, it was chosen as the best tall building in Asia and Australia by the Chicago-based Council for Tall Buildings and Urban Habitat (CTBUH). In November 2014 it was named the best tall building in the world by CTBUH. In October 2014 it was named the Overall Winner of the 2014 LEAF Award.

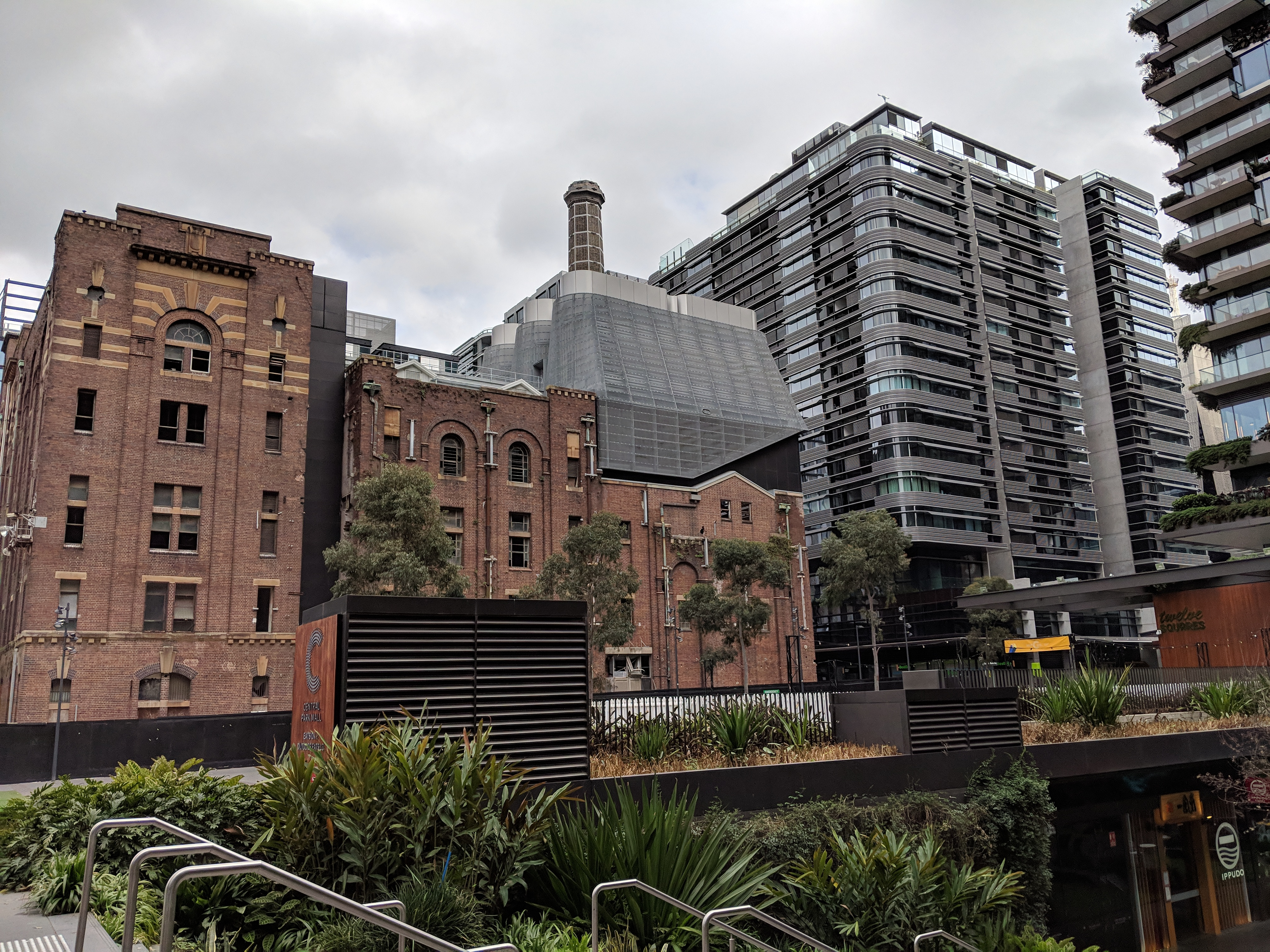
Brewery Yard

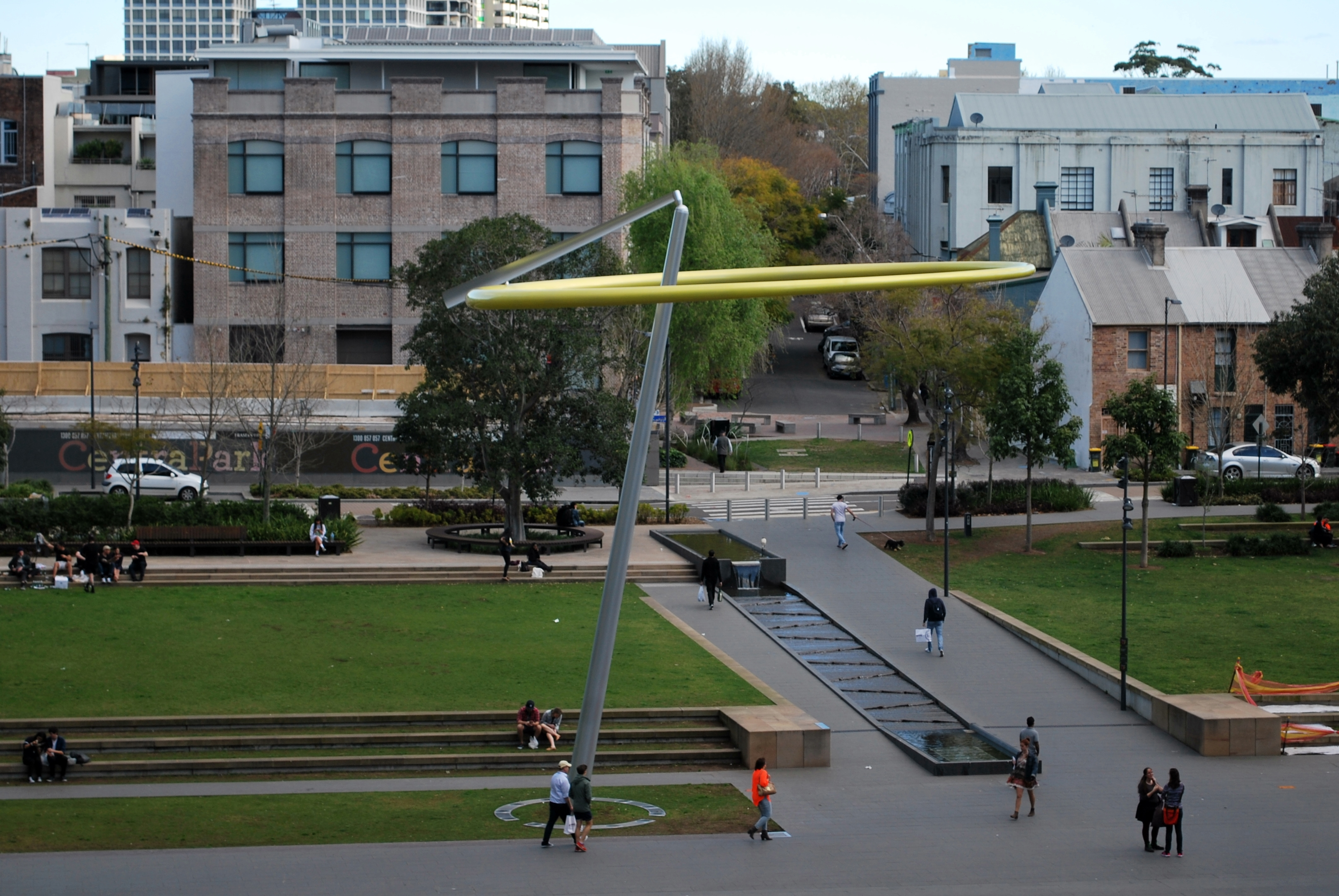
Halo in Central Park (2015)

=== The Mark ===
The Mark
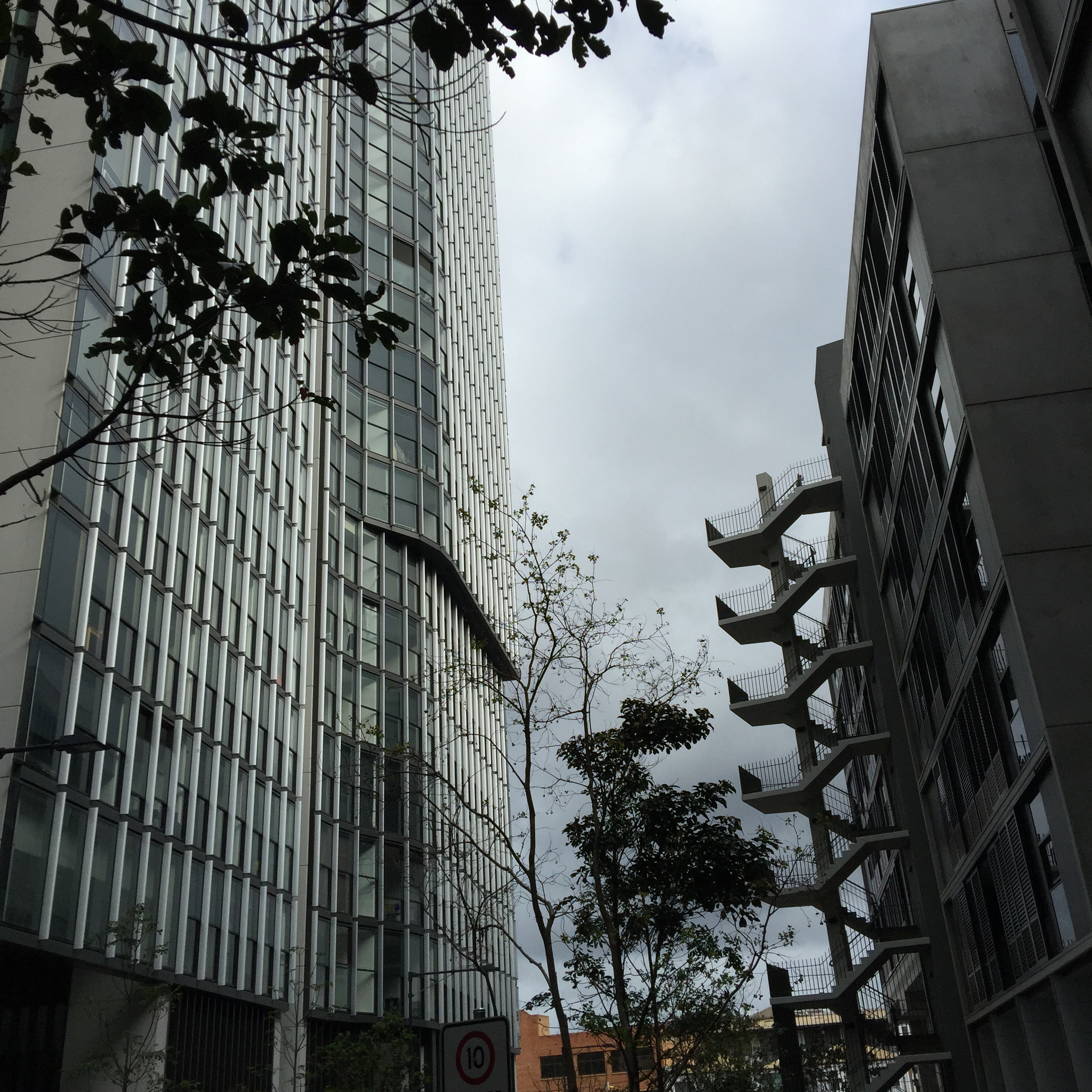
- Kent Road facade

- Location within inner Sydney

General information
- Status: Completed
- Type: Residential apartment
- Location: Broadway, Chippendale, Sydney, New South Wales, Australia
- Coordinates: 33.8857°S 151.2013°E

Technical details
- Floor count: 27
- Floor area: 24,000 square metres (260,000 sq ft)

Design and construction
- Architecture firm: Johnson Pilton Walker
- Developer: Frasers Property and Sekisui House Australia
- Main contractor: Watpac
- Awards: 2015 UDIA NSW High-Density Development Award

Website
- www.centralparksydney.com/live/sold-out/the-mark

The Mark is a residential apartment complex located in Central Park. The building comprises two building groups: Mark One and Mark Two. Mark One is level 1–19, which primarily one and two bedroom floor plans. Mark Two is level 20–27, with two and three bedroom apartment units.

The Mark is located south of the Sydney central business district, in the Central Park development, which comprises residential, retail and commercial. Central Park was jointly developed by Frasers Property and Sekisui House Australia and was designed by Johnson Pilton Walker. The development was contracted to Watpac. The building was one of the stage two development of Central Park, which was started in September 2011 and was completed in August 2014.

Sustainability features include:

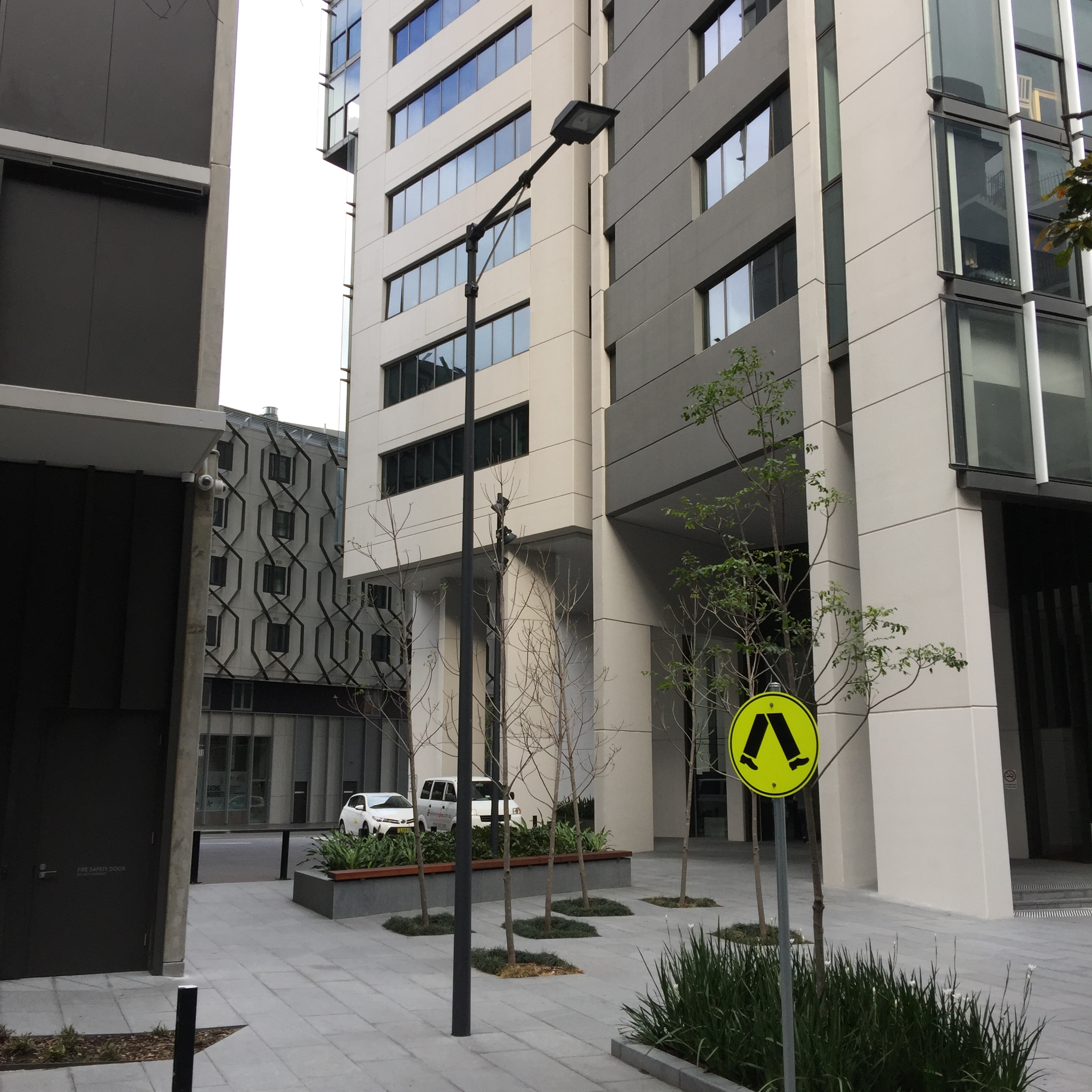
O'Connor Street facade

- Establishment of a sustainability team which consisted of experienced consultants and committed subcontractors.
- An on-site trigeneration plant to reduce carbon emissions.
- A recycled water treatment plant (blackwater system to minimise the demand of main water. The water is collected from rainwater at roof, storm water, groundwater, sewage from adjacent public sewer and building within the development, backwash from pools and spas in the development, and irrigation water from green walls. The recycled water is used for toilet flushing, irrigation, washing machines and mechanical plant.
- Sub-meters and smart metre panels are provided in each apartment.
- Use of environment-friendly materials throughout the project.
- Use of highest available water and energy rated appliances to every apartment.
- Series of training sessions were provided to staffs, client and project's subcontractors.

==== Awards ====
- Winner of High-Density Development category of UDIA NSW 2015 Awards (NSW).
- Shortlisted in Design and Innovation category of UDIA NSW 2015 Awards (NSW).

==== Heritage ====
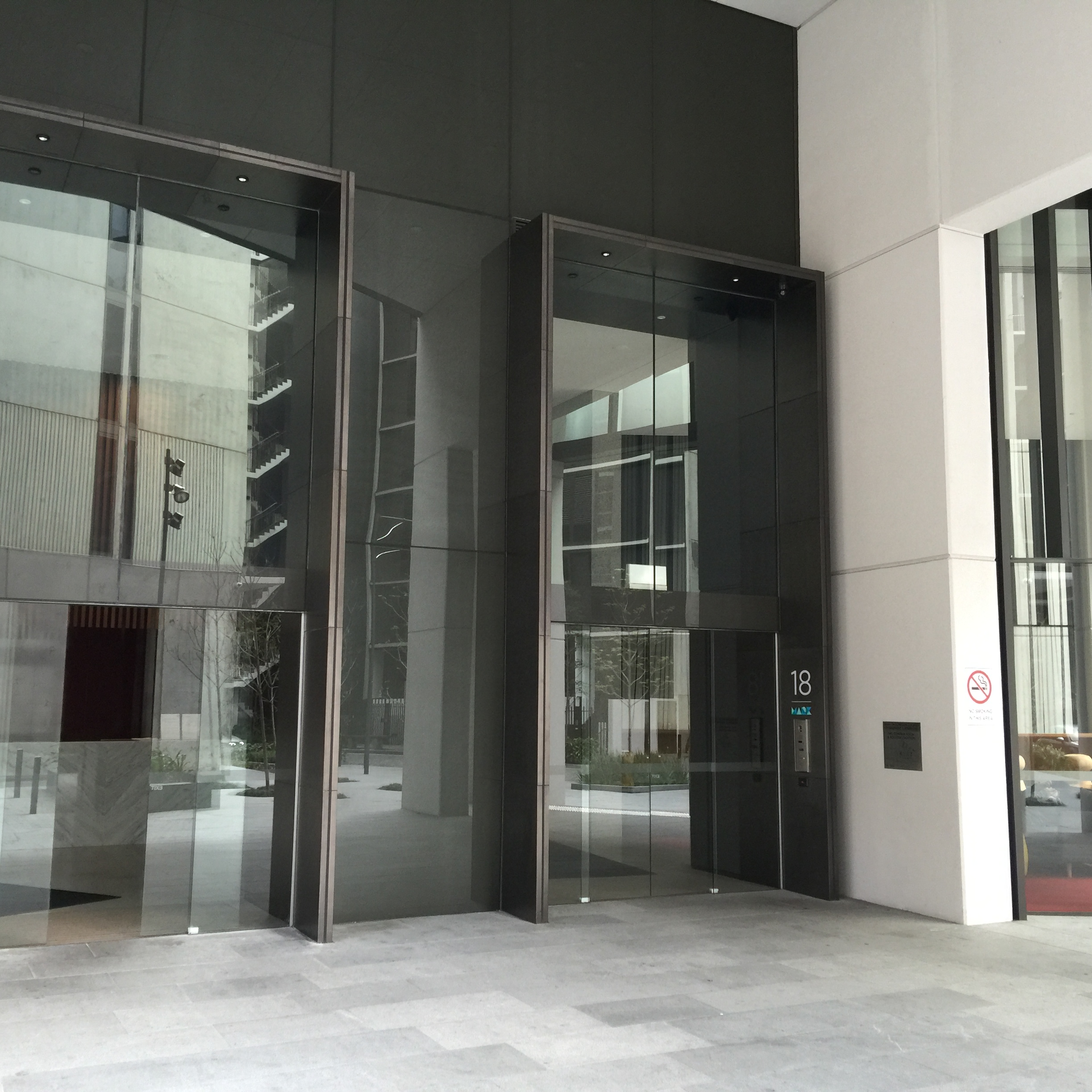
Main entrance

The site formally was Carlton & United Breweries site in Chippendale. Heritage consultants Godden Mackay Logan was engaged to undertake the comprehensive site survey, analysis, archaeological investigation and documentation. Urbis, who is heritage architect was engaged to adaptively reuse of heritage structures in collaboration with the project architects. In the end, there are 33 items were identified as heritage items and have been retained. The heritage items including the tiled arch at Kent Road, terraces and warehouses along Kensington Street, three hotels, the brewery yard buildings and brick stack and the administration building have been adaptively reused in an architecture award winning refurbishment by Tzannes architects.

=== Commercial buildings ===
London architects Foster + Partners are the designers behind Central Park's first commercial buildings known as Central Park Mall, which is anchored by Woolworths and features over 75,000 square metres of office and retail space.

=== Parkland ===
Central Park includes two parks. In addition to the main park, a pocket park known as the Balfour Street Park was created by closing a section of Balfour Street. The park provides a connection between Central Park and the rest of Chippendale. It opened in April 2010. The main park, called Chippendale Green, opened on 17 December 2012.

=== Artworks ===
Halo, a wind powered kinetic sculpture by Jennifer Turpin and Michaelie Crawford was installed in Central Park in 2012. It involves a ring turning and tilting atop a mast in response to wind.

== See also ==
Other large-scale inner-city urban renewal projects in Sydney:

- Barangaroo, New South Wales
- Green Square, New South Wales
- Architecture of Sydney
