= BESIX Watpac =

Australian construction and civil engineering company

- Formerly: Watpac; Watkins Pacific
- Type: Subsidiary
- Traded as: ASX: WTP
- Industry: Construction
- Founded: 1983
- Founder: Gregory Watkins
- Headquarters: Brisbane, Queensland, Australia
- Revenue: $1.1 billion (2018)
- Owner: Besix
- Number of employees: over 600 (2021)
- Website: www.besixwatpac.com.au

BESIX Watpac is an Australian construction and civil engineering company. Formerly listed in on the Australian Securities Exchange, it is now a subsidiary of Besix.

== History ==
BESIX Watpac was founded by Gregory Watkins in Brisbane, Queensland as Watkins Pacific in 1983. It was listed on the Australian Securities Exchange as Watpac in 1985. During the 1980s and 1990s, it acquired a businesses in Mackay and opened offices on the Gold Coast and in Townsville, Cairns and Canberra. It also operated in Hawaii and Vietnam.

In 2004 Watpac purchased Grant Constructions, giving it a New South Wales presence. In 2007 it purchased Melbourne based JA Dodd. In 2008 it purchased JMS Civil & Mining with operations in Adelaide and Perth. Besix that had been a major shareholder since 2013, took full ownership in 2018 with the company delisted from the Australian Securities Exchange and rebranded BESIX Watpac. The civil and mining business was not included, being sold to Remagen Capital.

== Notable projects ==
Notable projects completed have included:

- Brisbane Entertainment Centre, completed 1986
- Townsville Entertainment & Convention Centre
- Skyline Apartments, Brisbane, completed 2007
- 275 George Street, Brisbane, completed 2008
- Central Park,_Sydney, completed 2013
- One Central Park, Sydney, completed 2013
- The Mark (Sydney), completed 2014
- 180 Brisbane, completed 2015
- North Queensland Stadium, Townsville, completed 2020
- North Sydney ferry wharf rebuild, completed 2022
- Kangaroo Point Green Bridge, completed in 2023
- Barangaroo railway station, opened on 19 August 2024

== Sponsorships ==
Watpac was the naming rights sponsor of the Townsville 400 from 2017 until 2019.
