= Balfour Street Park =

Park in New South Wales, Australia

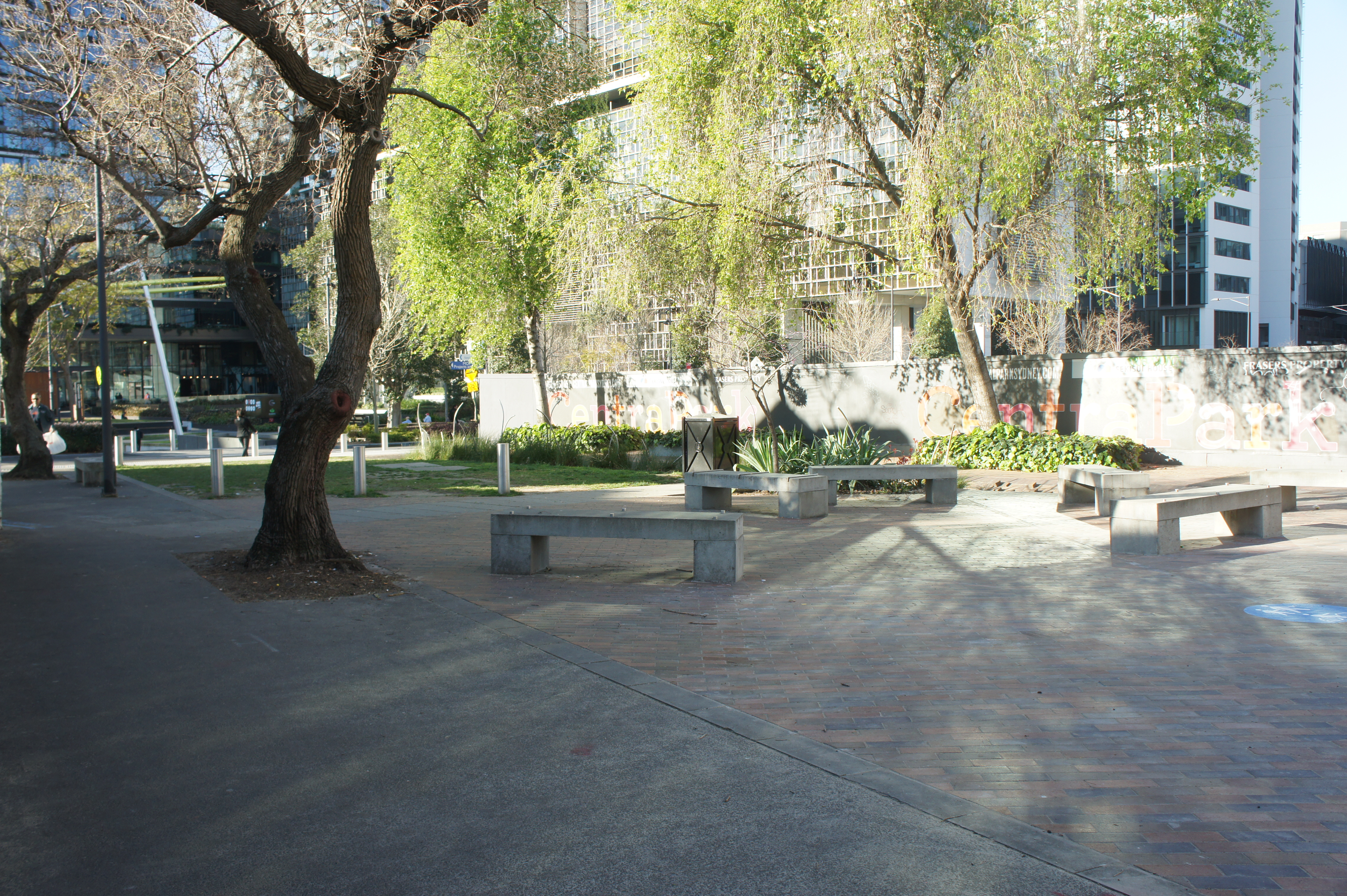
- Balfour Street Park located between O'Connor Street and Wellington Street

- Location within Sydney
- Interactive map of Balfour Street Park
- Type: Urban park
- Location: Chippendale, Sydney, New South Wales, Australia
- Coordinates: 33°53′10″S 151°12′01″E
- Area: 640 m^{2} (6,900 sq ft)
- Created: 19 June 2011
- Operator: City of Sydney
- Status: Open all year

Balfour Street Park is a public pocket park located in the inner Sydney suburb of Chippendale, in the state of New South Wales, Australia. The park is located in a small street closure on Balfour Street between Wellington Street and O’Connor Street. Balfour Street Park is a pedestrian threshold to Central Park and was designed by the City of Sydney in collaboration with JILA (Jane Irwin Landscape Architecture), and constructed by Design Landscape for Frasers Property. It won the Horbury Hunt Brick Award for Urban Design and Landscape Architecture in 2010. The park was formally opened on 19 June 2011 by the Lord Mayor, Clover Moore.

== Design ==
The initial design of Balfour Street Park was undertaken by Sue Barnsley Design, aiming to mediate the two differing scales of the large scale adjacent Central Park development and the smaller scale residential nature of the site. JILA retained this conceptual design and sought to expand upon it through the incorporation of the richness of the materials and intimate detail which relates back to the human scale. By closing Balfour Street between O’Connor and Wellington Streets, the park is able to offer more open space for local residents, and provide an essential pedestrian and cyclist connection to Broadway, improving local traffic management.

=== Features ===
The dominant material in the design of the pocket park is bricks, to connect to the materiality of the surrounding buildings. The bricks are laid on two different axes with one direction facing the drainage channel and the other facing towards the grass area. A brick swale with arching antenna lighting acts as the focal point of the park during the day and at night, in addition to providing a drainage point. The brick swale also incorporates protruding bricks which detain any rubbish and slow down the water flow. Furthermore, the site references the area's built history and character through the paving materials, including trachyte recycled from local kerbing.

== Gallery ==
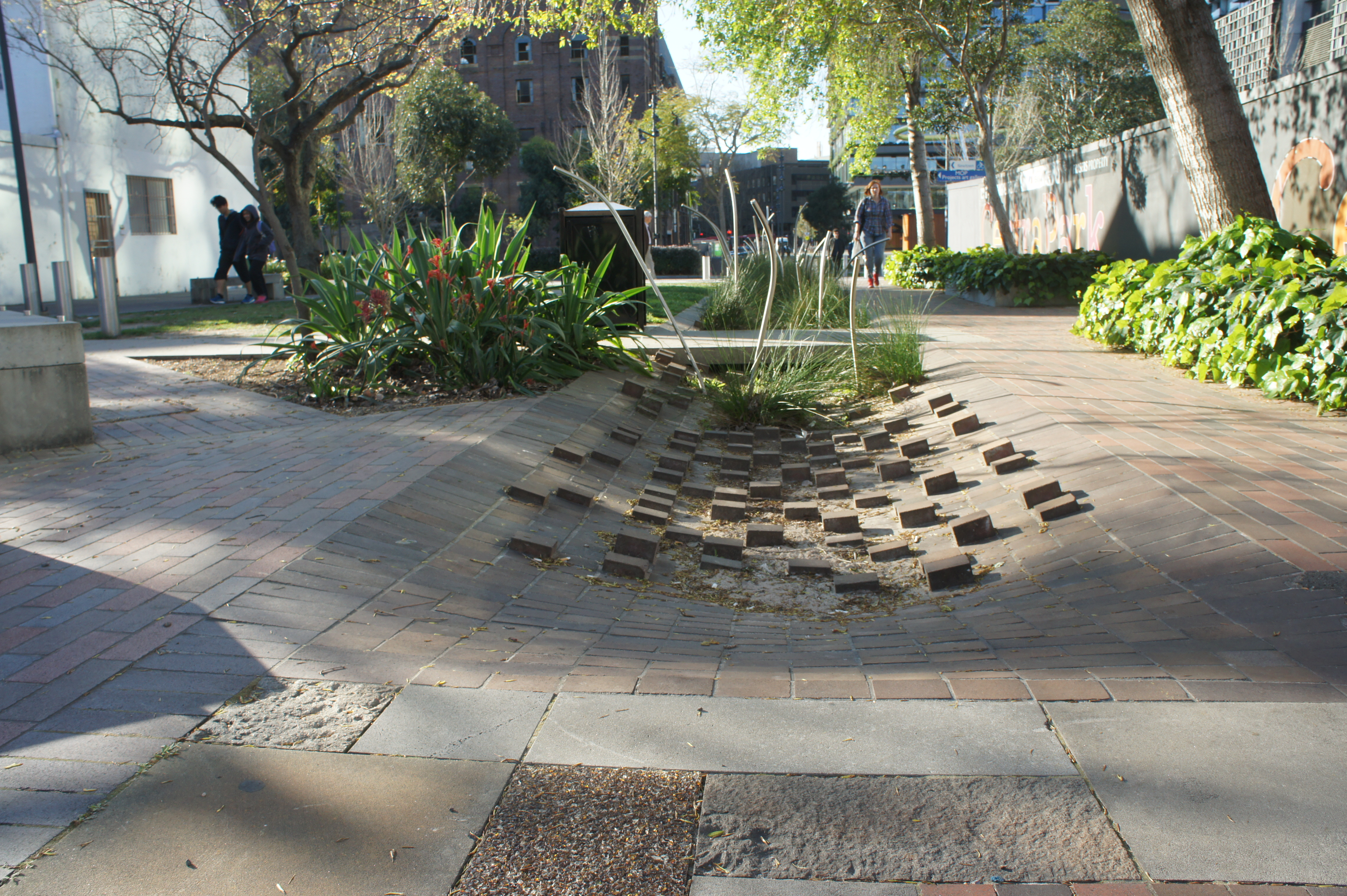
The brick swale feature which slows water flow and captures any rubbish

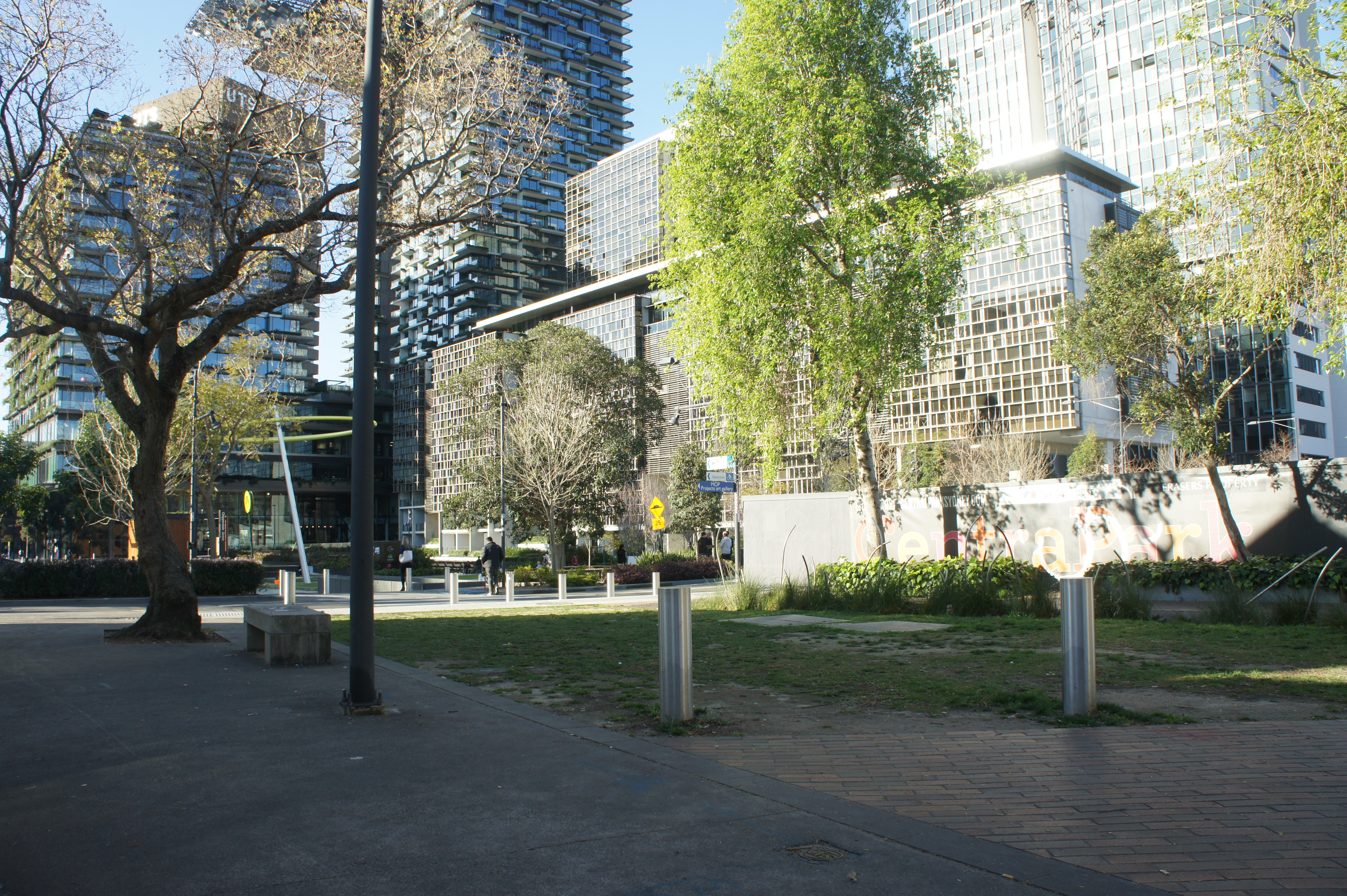
Central Park in background

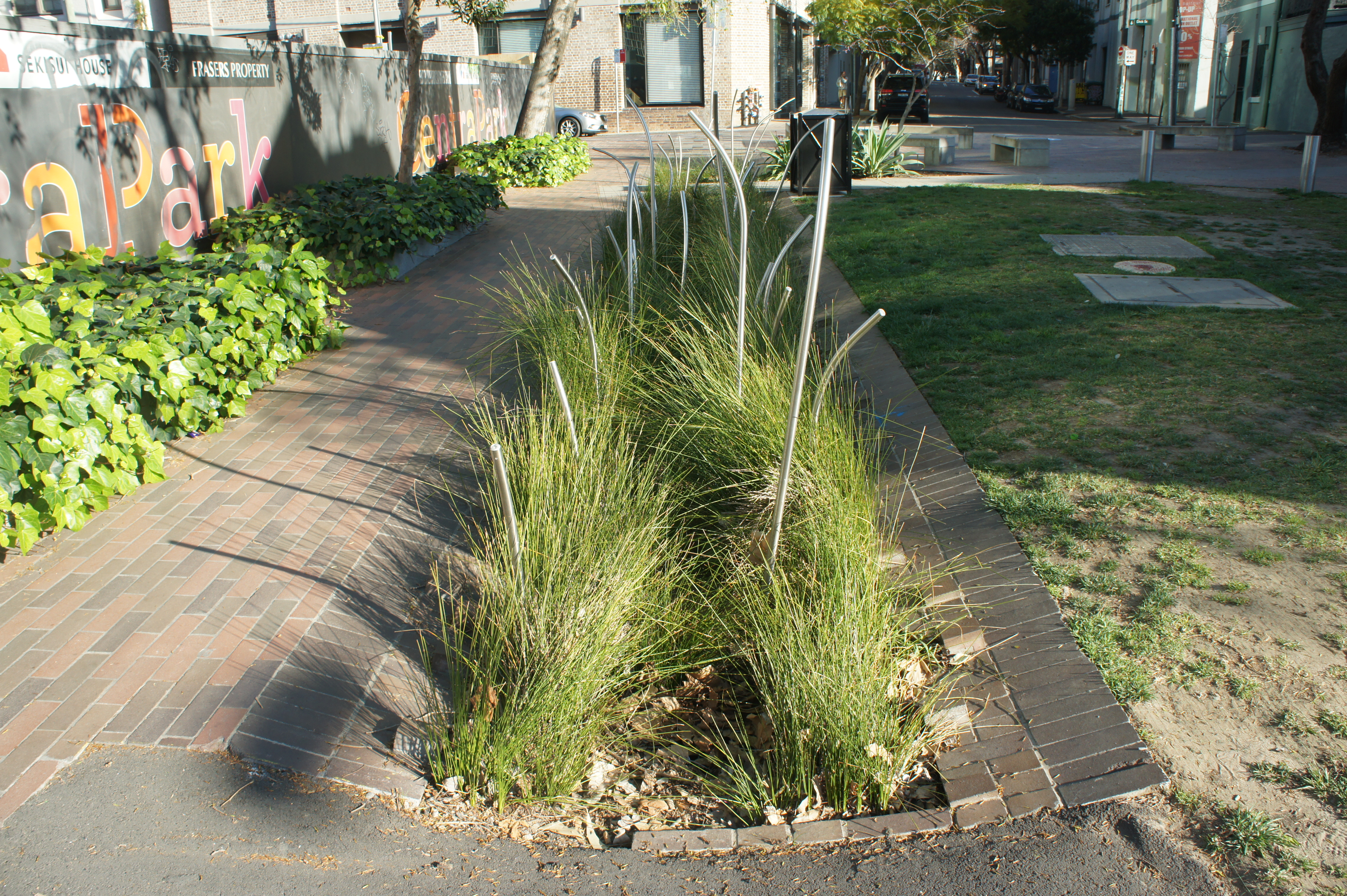
Brick swale vegetation

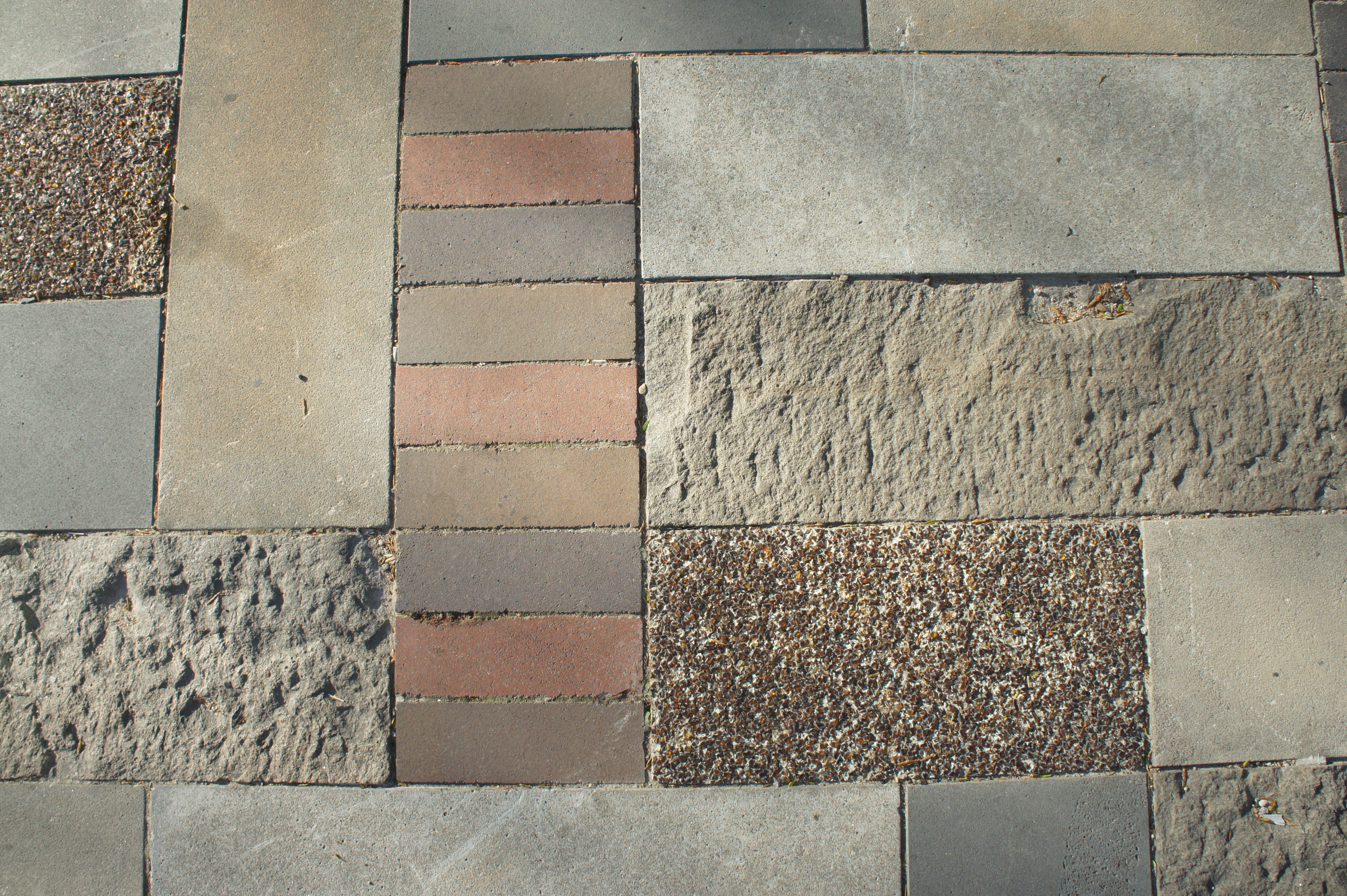
Brick paving

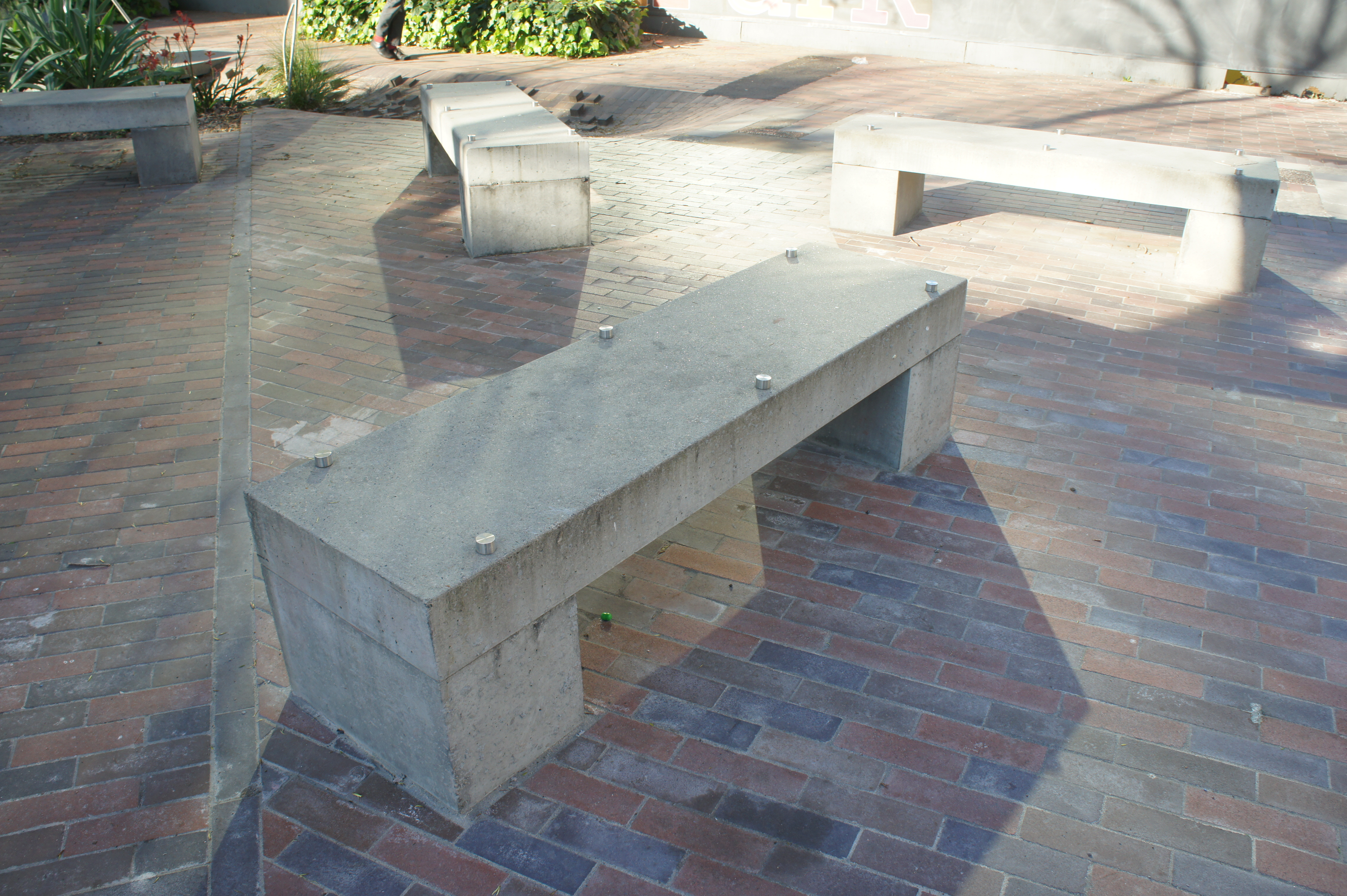
Fixed concrete benches

== See also ==
- Parks in Sydney
