= 180 Brisbane =

152-metre skyscraper in Brisbane, Queensland, Australia

- 180 Brisbane in 2019

General information
- Status: Completed
- Location: 180 Ann Street, Brisbane, Queensland, Australia
- Coordinates: 27.4668°S 153.0252°E
- Completed: 2015
- Cost: $300 million
- Owner: Daisho

Height
- Roof: 152 m (499 ft)

Technical details
- Floor count: 34
- Floor area: 59,100 m^{2} (636,000 sq ft)

Design and construction
- Architect: Crone Partners
- Main contractor: Watpac

180 Brisbane is a 152-metre skyscraper in Brisbane, Queensland, Australia. It is owned by Daisho.

The modern style office building is located at 180 Ann Street in the Brisbane central business district. The building was nicknamed the Brisbane River Tower as the building facade shows a huge imprint of the Brisbane River.

The Commonwealth Bank is the anchor tenant, having leased six floors and the building's naming rights. Other initial tenants include AMP, Origin Energy (eight floors) and Tabcorp.

Construction of the tower was delayed due to a slump in Brisbane's commercial property market. The building was completed in late-2015.

== See also ==
- List of tallest buildings in Brisbane
