= Skyline Apartments =

Australian skyscraper in Brisbane, Queensland

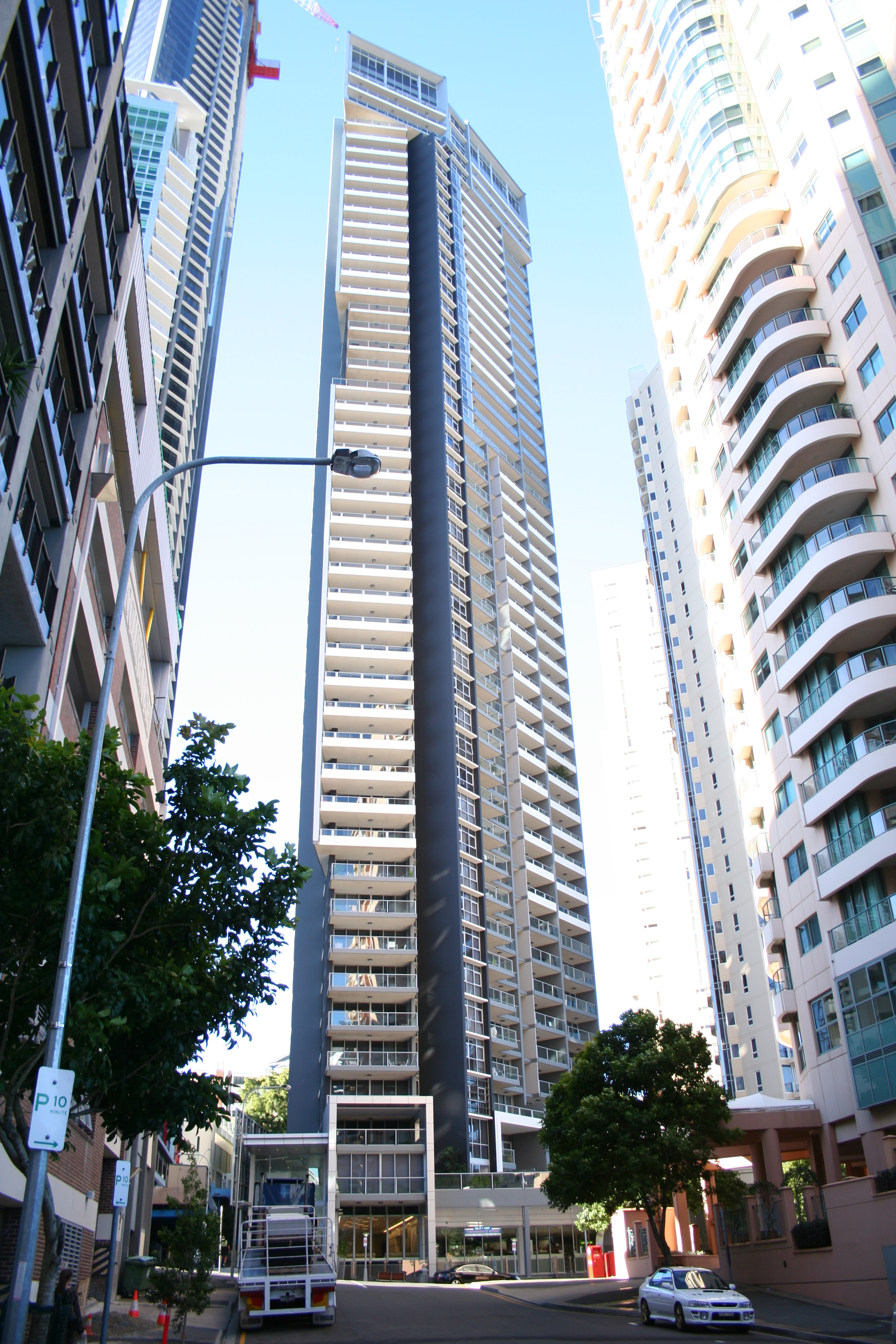
- Interactive map of the Skyline Apartments area

General information
- Status: Completed
- Type: Residential
- Location: 30 Macrossan Street; Brisbane, Queensland
- Coordinates: 27.462942°S 153.032711°E
- Construction started: July 2005
- Completed: 2007
- Opening: November 2007

Height
- Roof: 150.0 m (492.1 ft)

Technical details
- Floor count: 47

Design and construction
- Architect: Nettleton Tribe
- Developer: Seymour Group/ Ariadne Property
- Structural engineer: Robert Bird Group
- Main contractor: Watpac Construction

Skyline Apartments is a skyscraper in Brisbane, Queensland, Australia located in the CBD residential precinct known as Petrie Bight. Upon completion it was the third tallest residential building in Brisbane.

The 2,631 m^{2} site was formerly home to the 4BC Radio Studios, and is located on the Brisbane River in close proximity to the Story Bridge. The upper levels of the tower boast spectaculars views down both reaches of the Brisbane River.

The building contains 192 residential apartments, including two 2-level penthouse apartments. It is designed by Brisbane-based nettletontribe architects. Uniquely for a CBD building, the complex also includes tennis court as well as a gym, steam room and heated pool.

== See also ==
- List of tallest buildings in Australia
- List of tallest buildings in Brisbane
