= Chippendale, New South Wales =

Chippendale
- Suburb
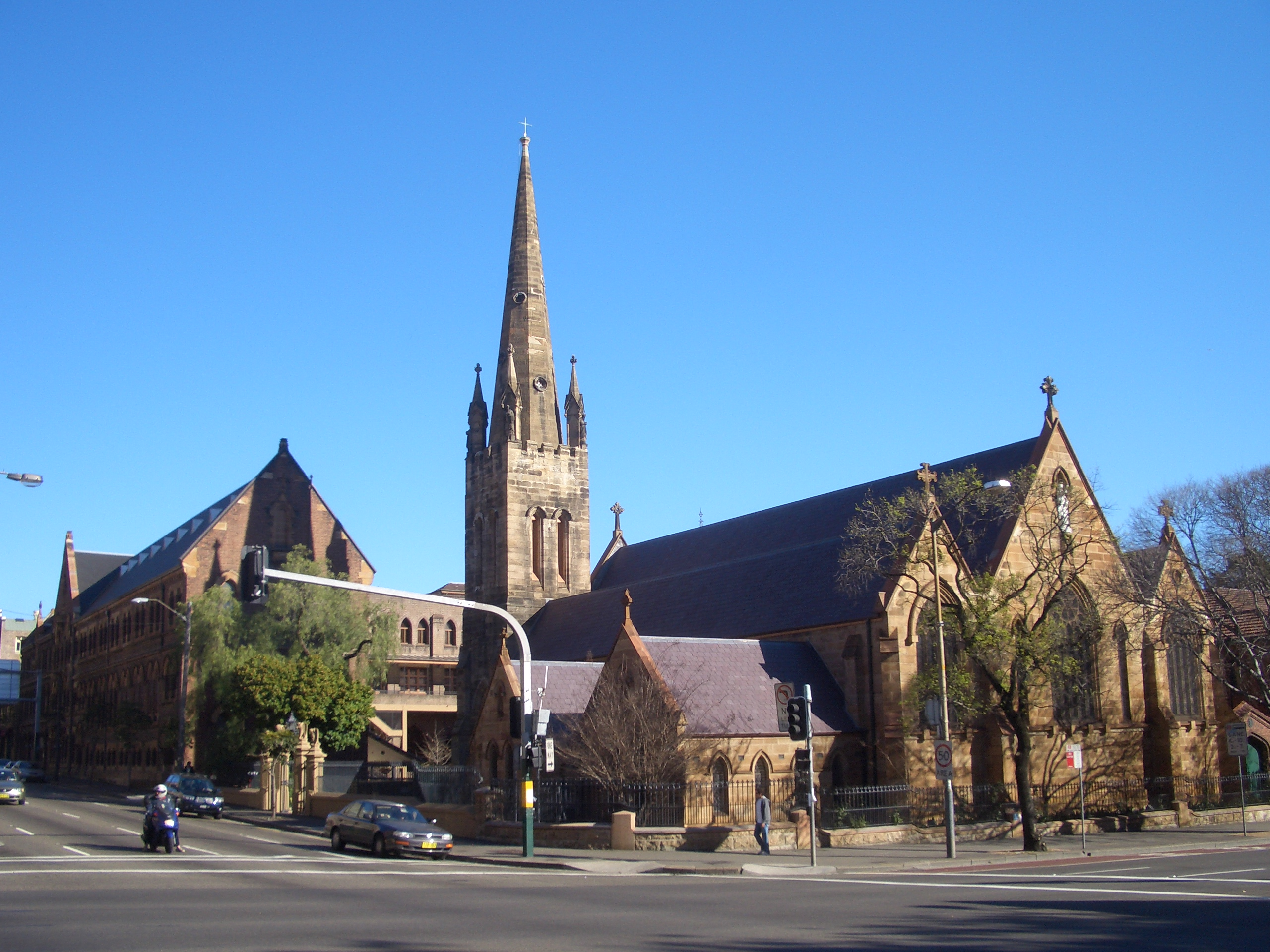
- St Benedict's Catholic Church and University of Notre Dame Australia Broadway campus

- Interactive map of Chippendale
- Country: Australia
- State: New South Wales
- City: Sydney
- LGA: City of Sydney
- Location: 2 km (1.2 mi) south of CBD

Government
  - State electorate: Newtown
  - Federal division: Sydney

Area
  - Total: 0.46 km^{2} (0.18 sq mi)

Population
  - Total: 7,803 (SAL 2021)
  - Density: 16,810/km^{2} (43,500/sq mi)
- Postcode: 2008
Suburbs around Chippendale
Glebe	Ultimo	Haymarket
Camperdown	Chippendale	Surry Hills
Darlington	Darlington	Redfern

Chippendale is a small inner-city suburb of Sydney, New South Wales, Australia on the southern edge of the Sydney central business district, in the local government area of the City of Sydney. Chippendale is located between Broadway to the north and Cleveland Street to the south, Central railway station to the east and the University of Sydney to the west.

== History ==
The area was first occupied by the Gadigal people of the Dharug Nation. William Chippendale was granted a 95-acre (38 ha) estate in 1819. It stretched to the present day site of Redfern railway station. Chippendale sold the estate to Solomon Levey, emancipist and merchant, in 1821, for £380. Solomon Levey died while in London in 1833. Levey's heirs sold over 62 acres (25 ha) to William Hutchinson.

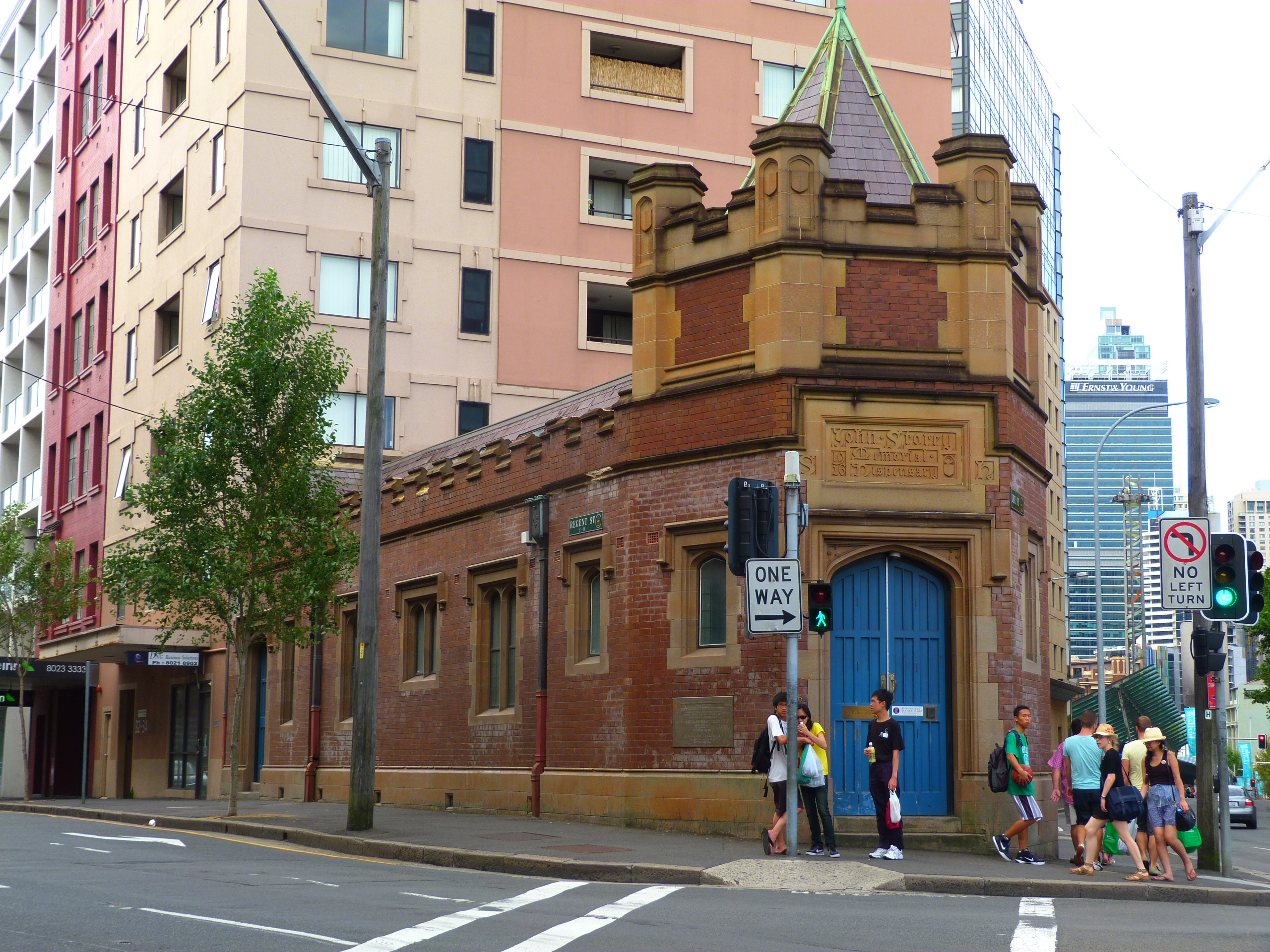
John Storey Memorial Dispensary (1926)

Chippendale has a number of heritage-listed sites, including the Regent Street railway station or 'Mortuary Station', located on the eastern side of the suburb. The John Storey Memorial Dispensary on Regent Street was built in 1926 as a memorial to John Storey, a former Premier of New South Wales.

Chippendale is adjacent to the suburb of Darlington, separated by Cleveland Street (part of the Southern Arterial Route). A 1981 report stated Darlington and Chippendale, "in many respects, see themselves as one community sharing most facilities (these majorly in the north) and their chief 'destroyer', Sydney University". Common problems described in this report included north/south through traffic, heavily-trafficked dividing and bordering roads including Cleveland, Abercrombie and Lawson Streets, shortage of public space ad dearth of local shops. The report stated "Chippendale has a high aboriginal population based round the Aboriginal Housing Company".

By 1981, Chippendale and Darlington had a resident parking scheme for 6 months.

== Commercial area ==
The eastern side of Chippendale, being adjacent to the CBD, has a greater mix use than other parts of the suburb. It includes smaller offices and warehouses as well as cafes and pubs. Transport for NSW has its headquarters here.

The western side of Chippendale is mainly residential with businesses interspersed in some parts of the precinct.

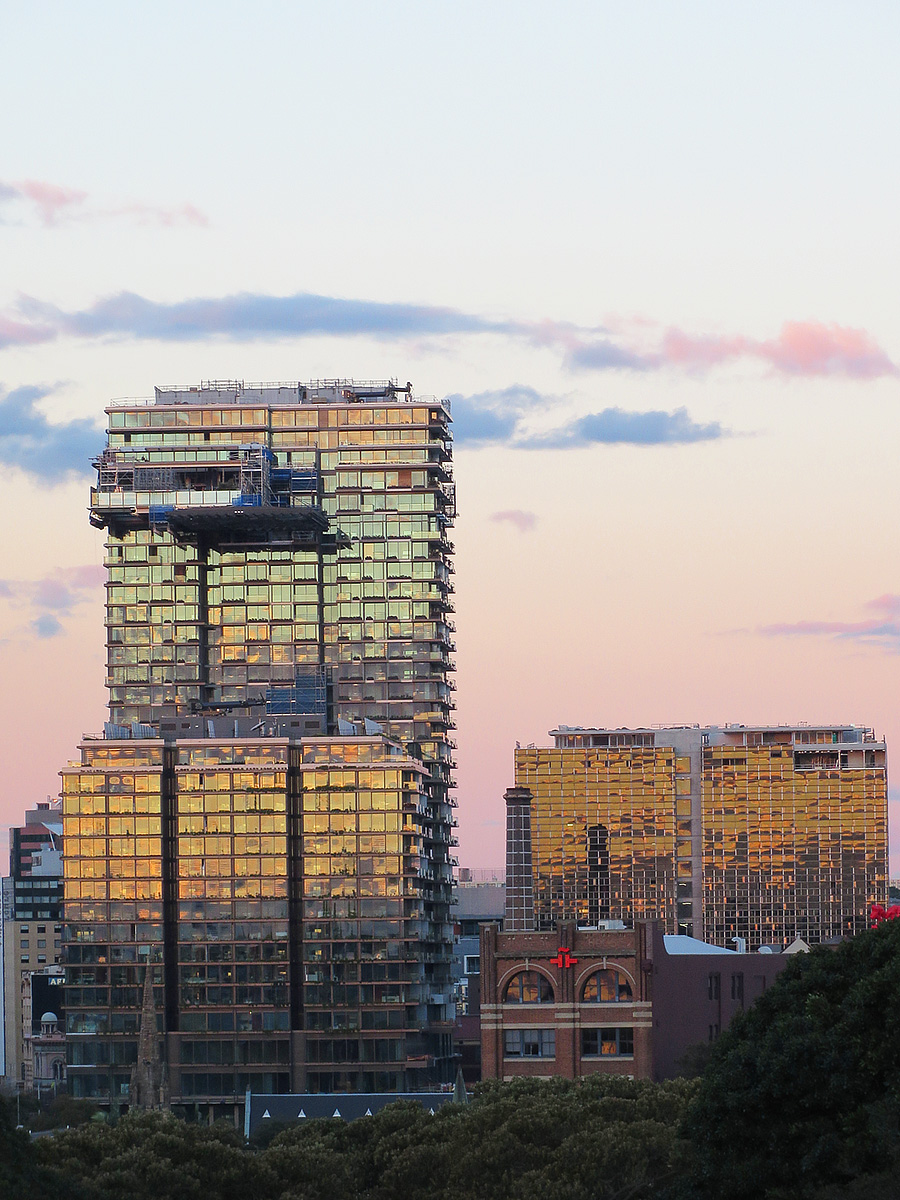
One Central Park apartments

=== Central Park, Sydney ===
The 168-year-old Carlton & United brewery closed in December 2006. Frasers Property purchased the brewery site from the Foster's Group in 2007 and lodged a plan for a major renewal project of the 5.8-hectare (14-acre) site. The development proposal "Central Park" included approximately 255,000 m^{2} of commercial and residential space, retention of a number of heritage buildings and the development of a large new park called Chippendale Green. One Central Park is a large mixed-use residential and commercial building on the site.

Balfour Street Park, at the corner of Balfour and O'Connor Streets, acts as a pedestrian gateway to Central Park. Chippendale has the lowest open space per person of any Sydney suburb (City of Sydney open space study, 2006). The addition of Chippendale Green has provided much needed green space; however, given the corresponding population increase from new developments, Chippendale now has less than 1 square metre of green space per resident.

== Schools ==
The University of Notre Dame Australia sits along the northern border with campus buildings scattered through the suburb. The University of Technology Sydney and the University of Sydney have campuses nearby. The Sydney campus of Curtin University is located at the eastern edge of Chippendale on Regent Street. The Boston University Sydney Campus is located on Regent Street in Chippendale.

== Culture ==
Chippendale has become known as one of the key creative art districts of Sydney with more than a dozen galleries in the small neighbourhood (including White Rabbit Gallery, MOP Projects, and Pine Street Creative Arts Centre). Various creative events in the suburb also take place each year such as the Beams Festival. Artist residencies were offered with the cooperation of Frasers during the construction of Central Park and Chippendale houses a lively creative community.

=== Nightlife ===
Chippendale has a number of pubs and bars. It has some of Sydney's most interesting bars.

The Abercrombie Hotel has multiple dance floors and a 24 hour licence.It includes a comprehensive nightclub program.

The Lansdowne Hotel hosts music, trivia nights, and other events. In 2017, The Preatures played there.

Except for the Strickland Park Playground, Railway Square, and on Central Station land, public drinking is legal in all streets and parks in Chippendale.

== Streets ==
=== Kensington street ===
Kensington Street is an inner city laneway, lined by heritage worker terraces and modern redeveloped buildings.

While the original master plans designated Kensington Street for pedestrians, the architect pushed for a shared zone. The design by the TDS and JAAA design team was a shared street.

In 2014, it was proposed to reallocate parking on the western side of the street as a loading zone (with 4 hour paid parking), 15 minute parking with 4 hour paid parking, and 15 minute parking adjacent to the hotel with extended hours 08:00 to 22:00.

The redevelopment of the street won the Urban Design and Public Spaces award and the Architectural Design award at the 2016 Good Design Awards, along with other awards.

The kensingtonstreet.com.au website is operated by Greencliff Realty Pty Ltd. The company purchased the entire eastern side of the street in 2012.

== Transport ==
Chippendale is serviced by the nearby Central railway station and Railway Square bus interchange.

Chippendale has a number of cycling routes connecting to it, including the Broadway Cycle Link (connecting Darlington and Ultimo through Chippendale) and the Glebe to Ultimo Cycleway.

In 2013, a number of route options for the Broadway Cycle Link route were considered. Traffic signals were not present at Myrtle Street and Abercrombie Street at the time.

In 2017, consultants were commissioned by the City of Sydney to undertake a Local Area Traffic Management (LATM) study of Chippendale to identify issues and develop a set of measures to improve public amenity.

In 2018, the urban heat island effect was studied in Chippendale.

== Population ==
=== Demographics ===
The demographics of Chippendale changed significantly since the development of Central Park. At the 2021 census there were 7,803 people living in Chippendale. 30.0% of people were born in Australia. The most common other countries of birth were China 19.6%, Indonesia 5.6%, Thailand 3.0%, Hong Kong 2.5% and Malaysia 2.4%. 39.0% of people only spoke English at home. Other languages spoken at home included Mandarin 22.0%, Cantonese 4.7%, Indonesian 4.3%, Thai 2.7% and Spanish 2.1%. The most common religious affiliation was "No Religion" 55.1%, followed by Catholic 10.2%, Not stated 10.2%, Buddhism 9.1% and Hinduism 2.3%.

At the 2016 census there were 8,617 residents in Chippendale.

In contrast, at the 2011 census, there were 4,057 residents; 38.3% were born in Australia and 50.1% only spoke English at home.

The 2016 census continued to show that the majority of people in Chippendale were attending an educational institution (58.2%). Of these, 67.3% were in a tertiary or technical institution.

=== Notable residents ===
- William Chippendale, Sydney land owner and farmer whose surname the suburb's name is derived from
- David Malouf, writer
- Michael Mobbs, author of Sustainable House

== Gallery ==
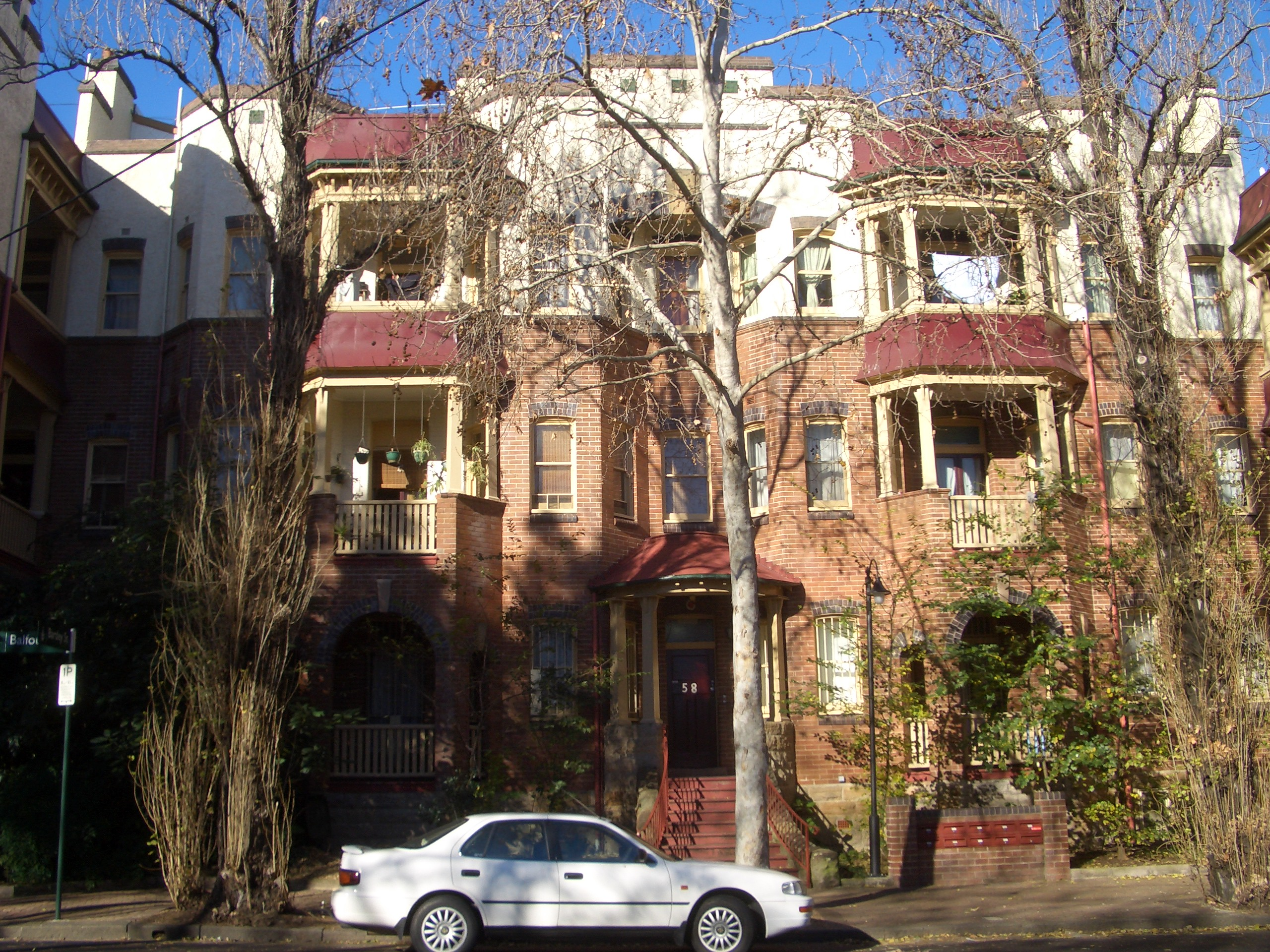
Chippen Street apartments

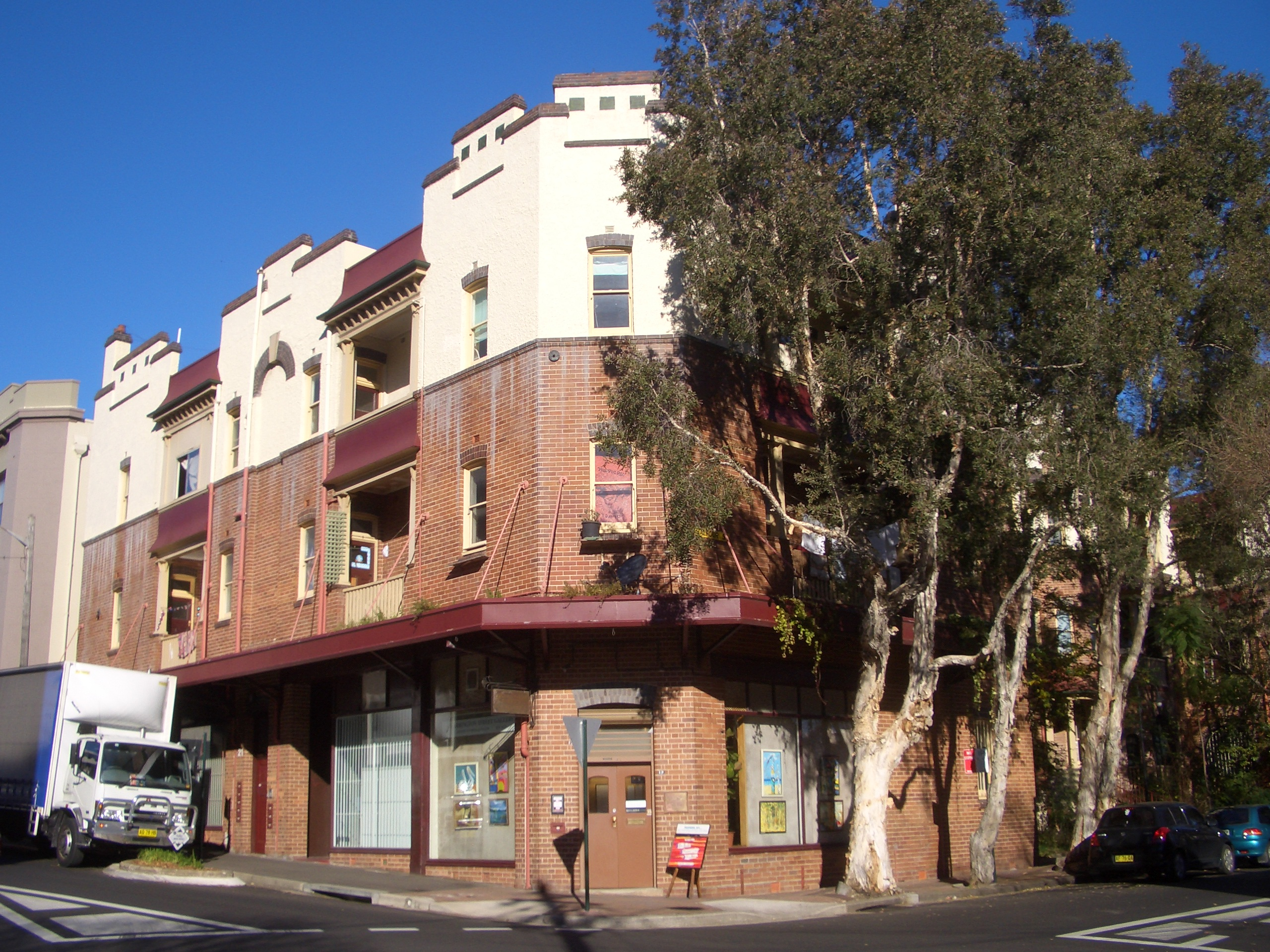
Meagher Street flats and gallery

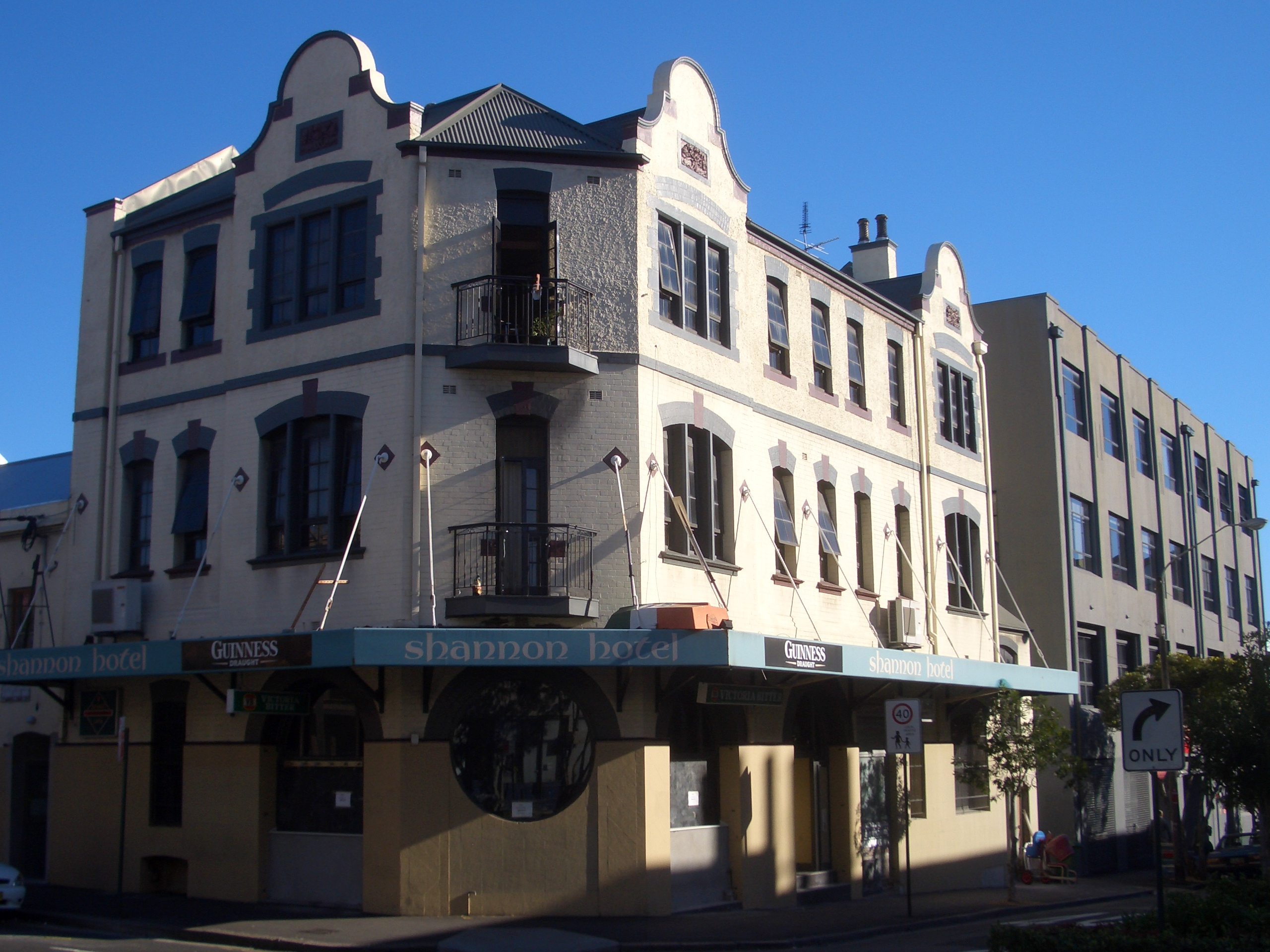
Former Shannon Hotel

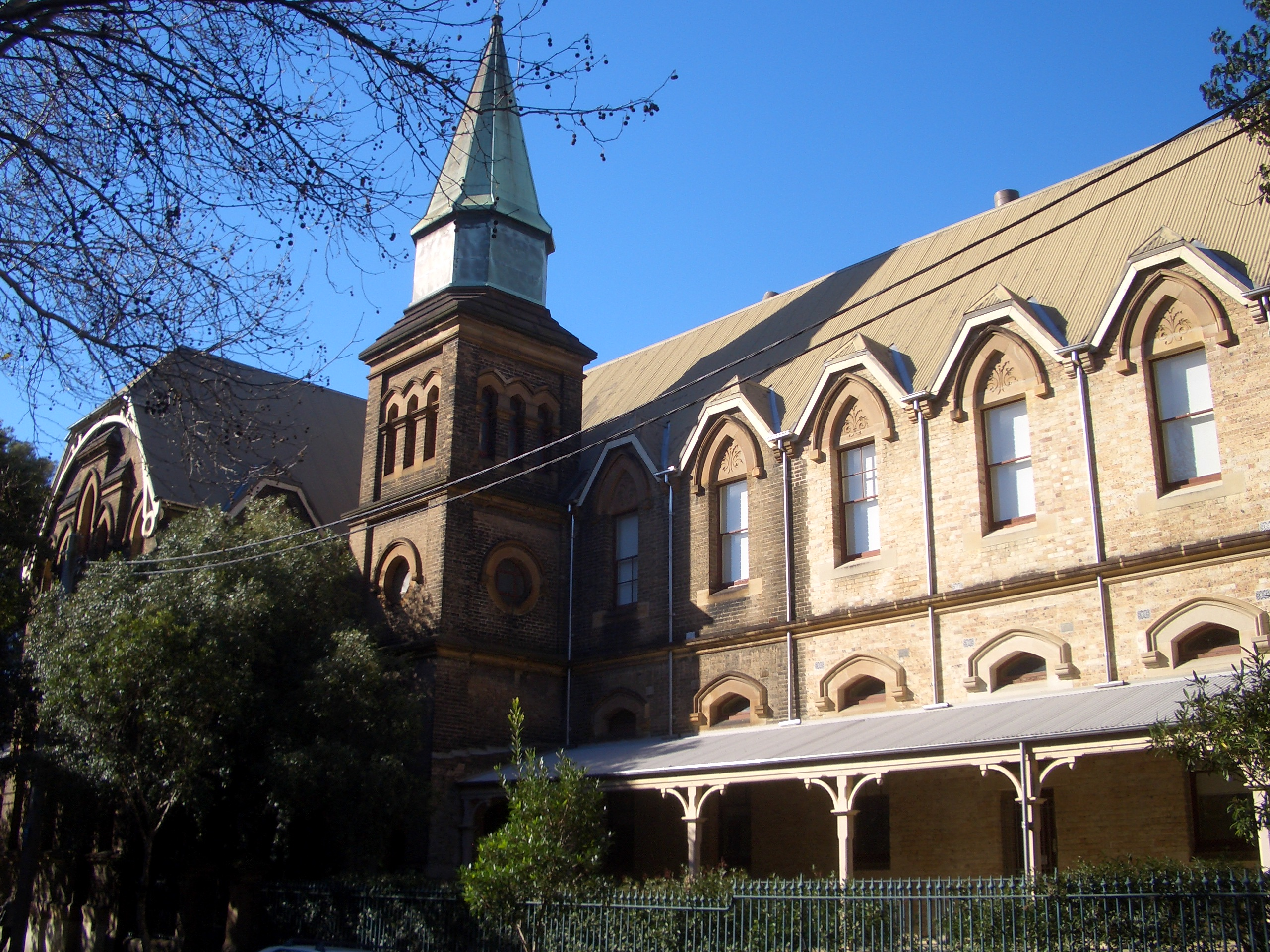
UTS Blackfriars Campus

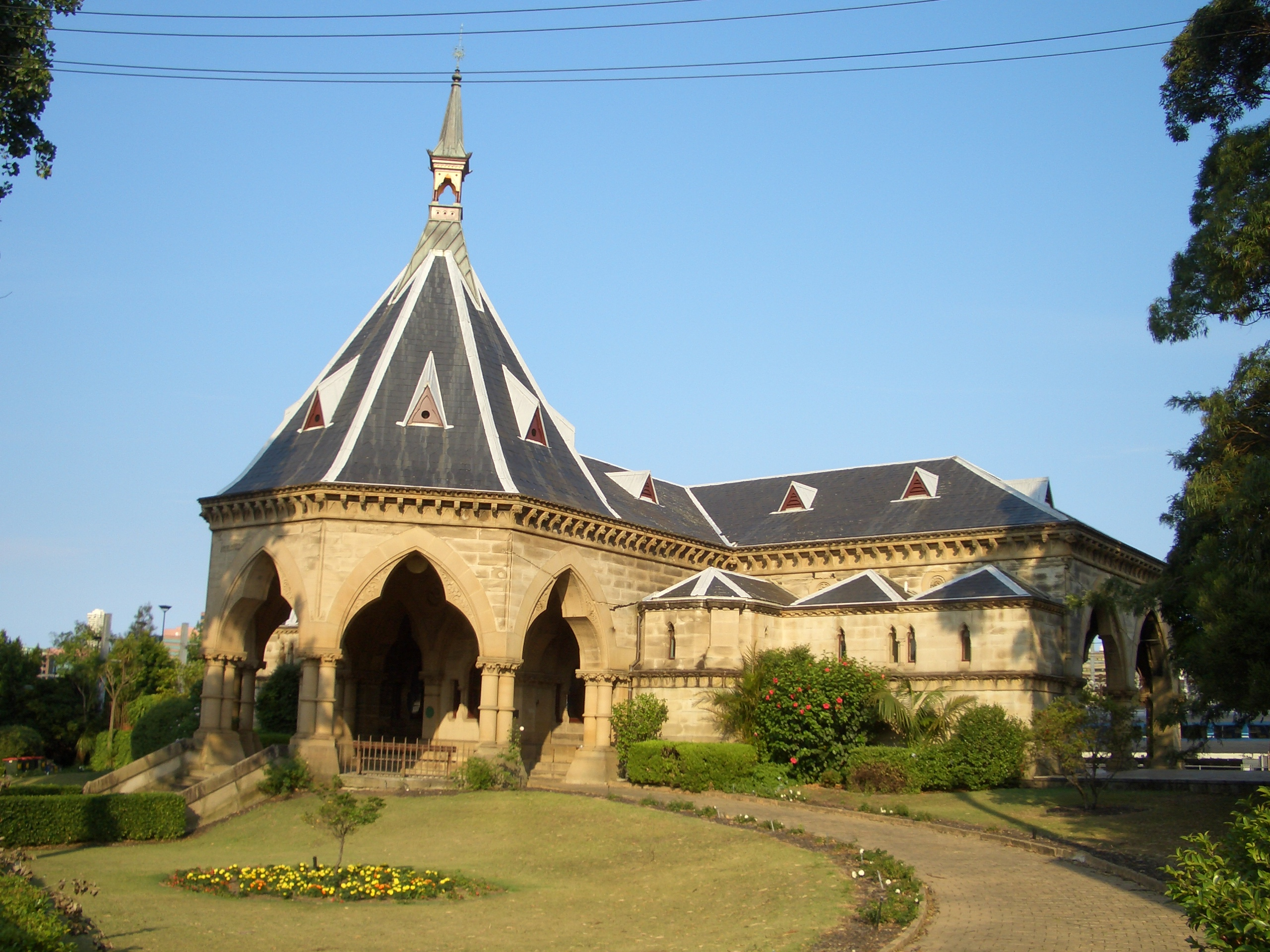
Mortuary Station

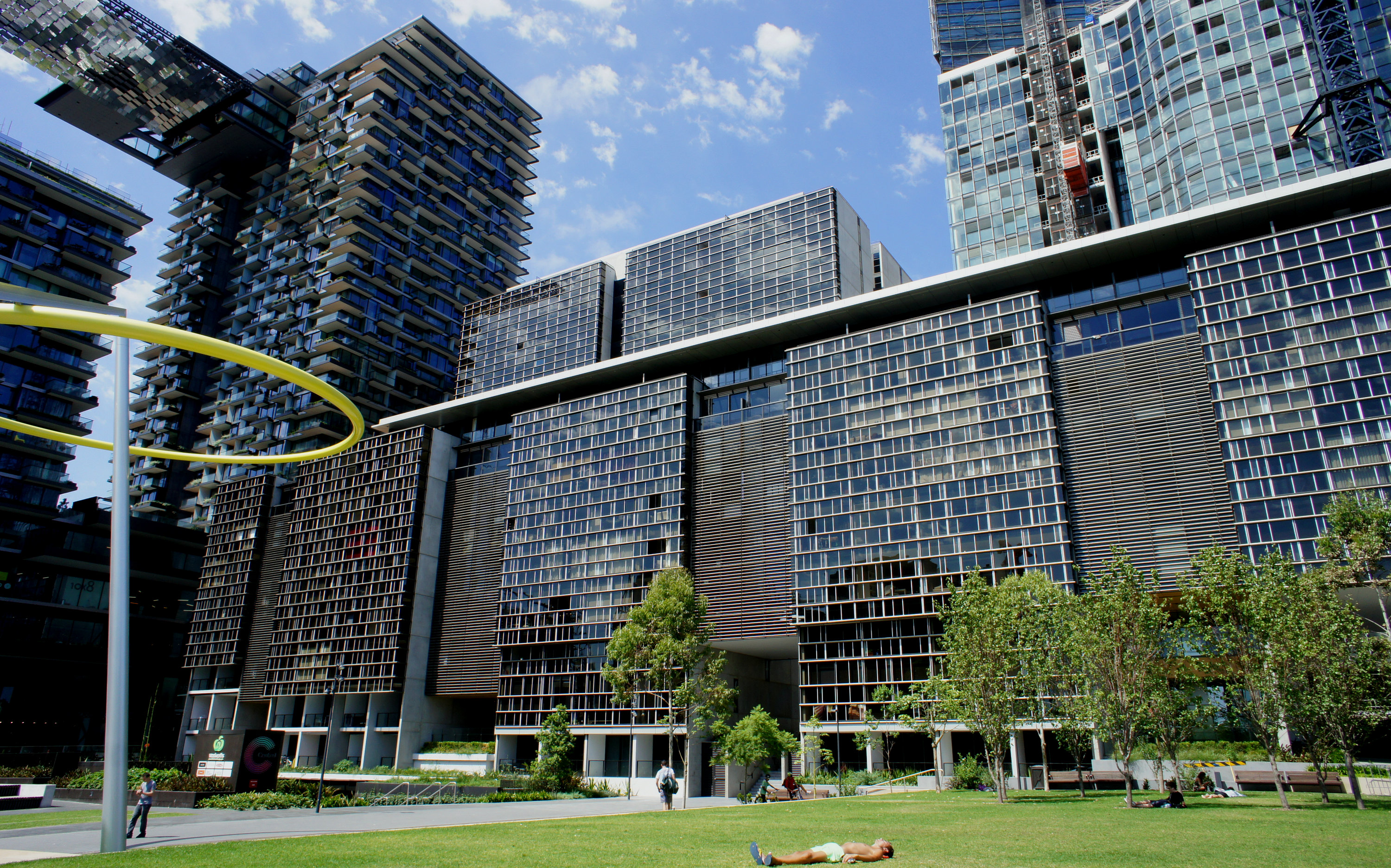
One Central Park

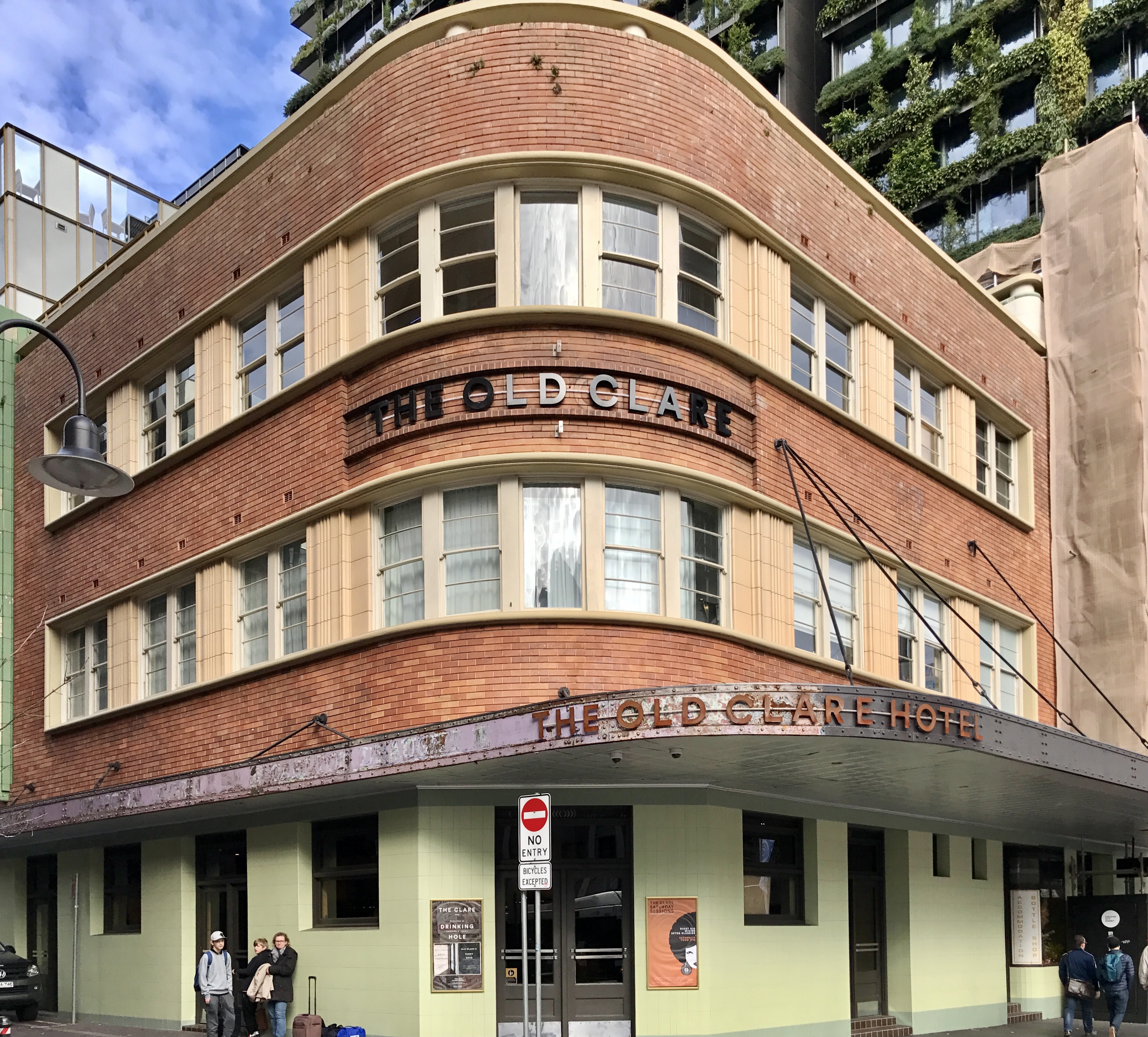
The Old Clare Hotel

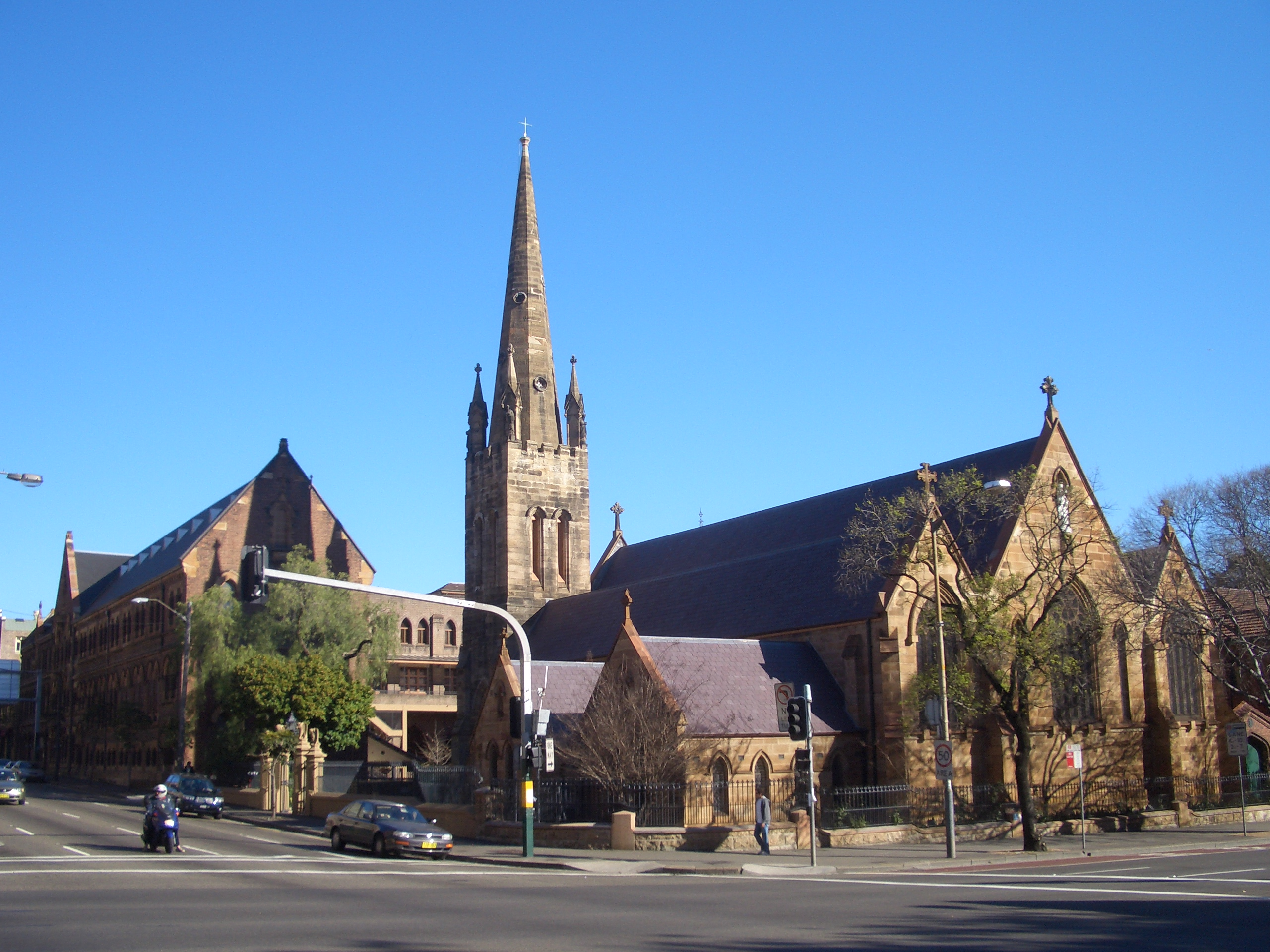
University of Notre Dame
