= GML Heritage =

Australian heritage consultancy firm

- Formerly: Godden Mackay; Godden Mackay Logan
- Type: Proprietary limited company
- Industry: Heritage consulting
- Founded: 1989 in Sydney, Australia
- Founders: Don Godden, Richard MacKay and David Logan
- Headquarters: Level 17, 323 Castlereagh St, Haymarket, New South Wales, Australia
- Key people: Sharon Veale, Rachel Jackson, David Logan, Tim Owen, Edwina Jans, Rebecca Hawcroft
- Number of employees: 67
- Website: www.gml.com.au

GML Heritage is an Australian consultancy firm established in 1989 as Godden Mackay Pty Ltd and then Godden Mackay Logan Pty Ltd after its three main founders.

Operating in Sydney and Canberra, GML Heritage undertakes heritage planning, management and conservation. In Melbourne, GML was formerly known as Context, which was also formed in 1989.

The two businesses merged in 2017. The firm employs over 60 historians, heritage experts, archaeologists, architects, interpretation planners and designers.

GML has delivered work within local neighbourhoods, significant places, iconic destinations and world heritage sites, including Budj Bim, the Sydney Opera House, the Eames House, Parramatta Park, Norfolk Island, First Government House, Royal Exhibition Building and Carlton Gardens, the Shine Dome and Old Parliament House.

The company has won numerous industry awards for its heritage advice and services.
