= Ivar Knudsen =

Danish engineer

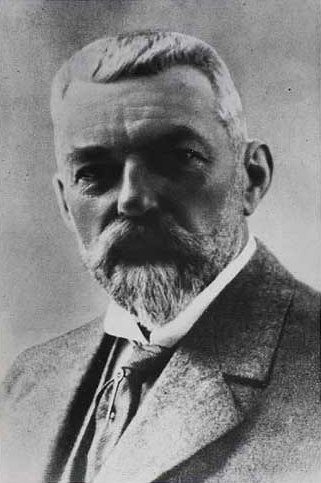
- c. 1912 portrait of Ivar Knudsen
- Born: 1 April 1861; Følle, Denmark
- Died: 23 March 1920 (aged 58); Mumbai, British Indian Empire
- Occupation: Engineer

Ivar Peter Bagger Knudsen (1 April 1861 – 23 March 1920) was a Danish engineer. As the director of Burmeister & Wain (B&W), Knudsen led the development of the MS Selandia, the biggest, most advanced diesel-powered vessel of its time.

== Early life ==
Knudsen was born to Jens Elsbert Knudsen (1826–1901), a manager of a grocery firm, and Julie Vilhelmine Rønberg (1828–88). He was the brother of military physician Morten Knudsen and the women's rights activist Olga Knudsen. He trained to be a mechanic in Aarhus and worked in this profession until 1882 when he went to Copenhagen to study at the Technical University of Denmark. After finishing his studies in 1887 he was involved in the design of the fortifications of Copenhagen. He then worked as a mechanical engineer for the electric utility of Copenhagen.

== Engineering career ==
In 1895 he joined B&W as chief mechanical engineer. He was promoted to Director of the engine department in 1897 where he started a comprehensive modernization. Knudsen realised the potential of the diesel engine as ship propulsion and traveled to Germany to meet Rudolf Diesel who was testing the new engines at MAN AG in Augsburg. Consequently B&W obtained the patent rights on the Diesel engine for Denmark. The following years saw numerous tests and improvements, eventually resulting in an efficient and reliable machine. In 1908 Knudsen became the head of both the machine factory in Christianshavn and the shipyard in Refshaleøen.

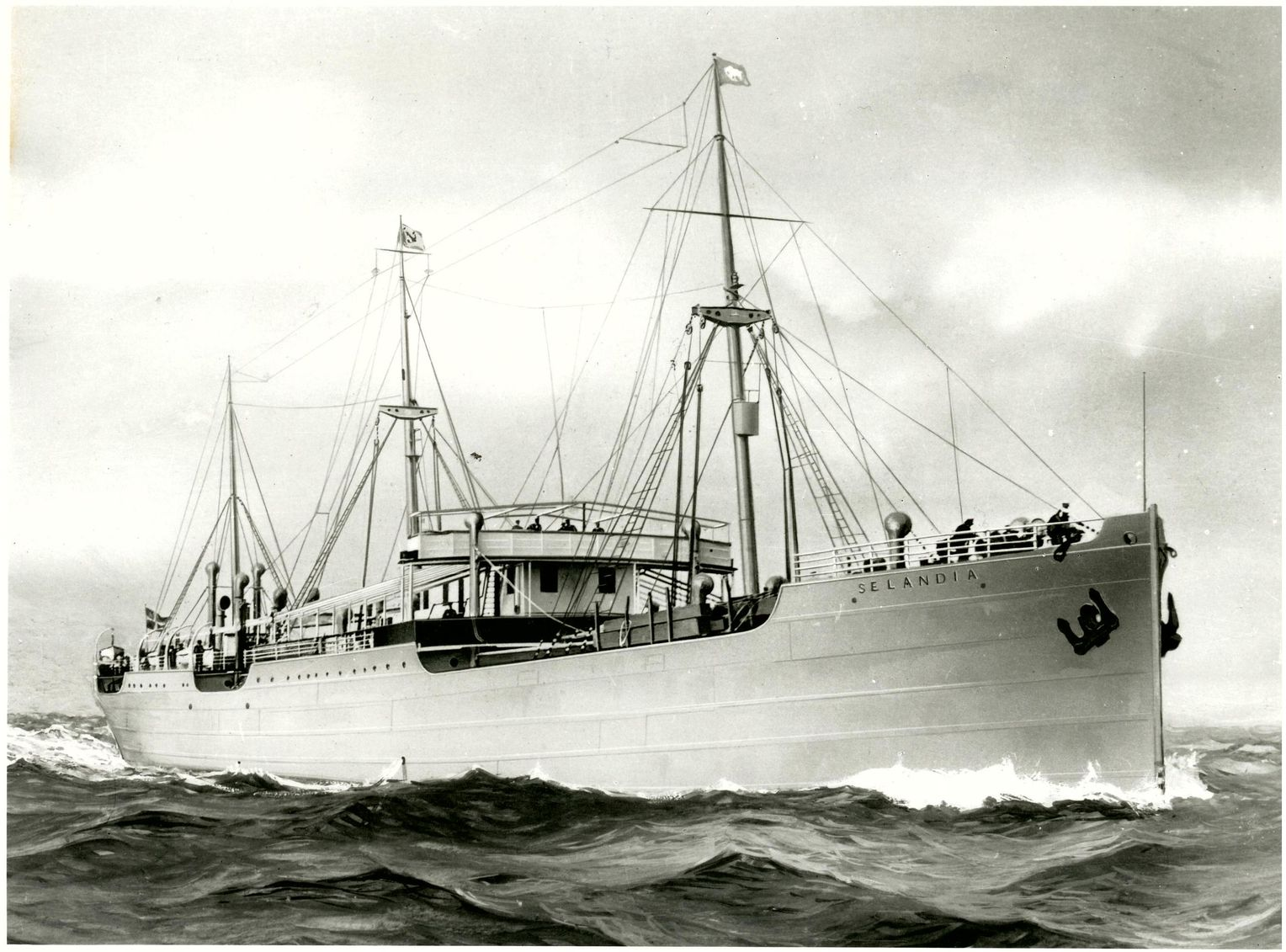
MS Selandia

Hans Niels Andersen, founder of the East Asiatic Company, saw that diesel powered ships would mean a leap forward for the shipping industry, and in December 1910 placed an order with B&W for a large oceangoing motor ship, the MS Selandia.

The first voyage in February 1912, with Andersen and Knudsen on board, was from Copenhagen to Bangkok via London and Antwerp. The ship was received with great interest and many people visited the Selandia including the First Lord of the Admiralty, Winston Churchill, and other high ranking naval officers.

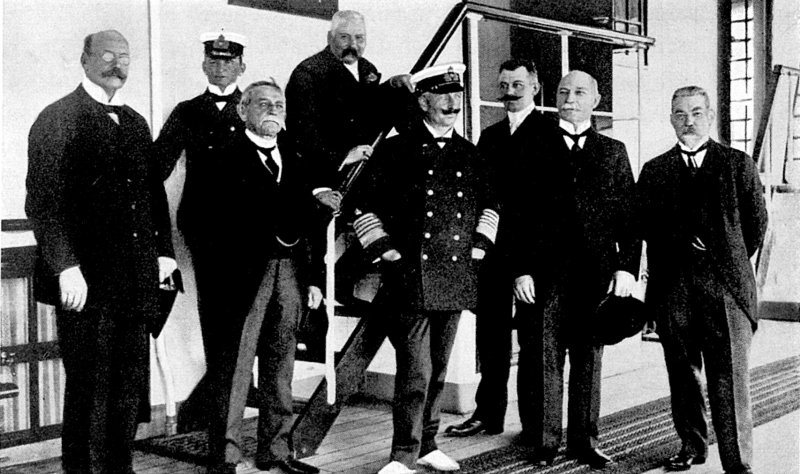
The Emperor William II visits the MS Fionia in Kiel, here in the company of H. N. Andersen and Ivar Knudsen.

Selandia had two sister ships, the MS Jutlandia and the MS Fionia; finishing their sea trials in June 1912, and July 1912, respectively. The Fionia was met with similar interest in Germany during Kiel Week, where visitors included German Emperor Wilhelm II and Albert Ballin, director of the Hamburg America Line.

Knudsen resigned from the yard's daily management in April 1919, joining the company's board as an advisor.

== Personal life ==
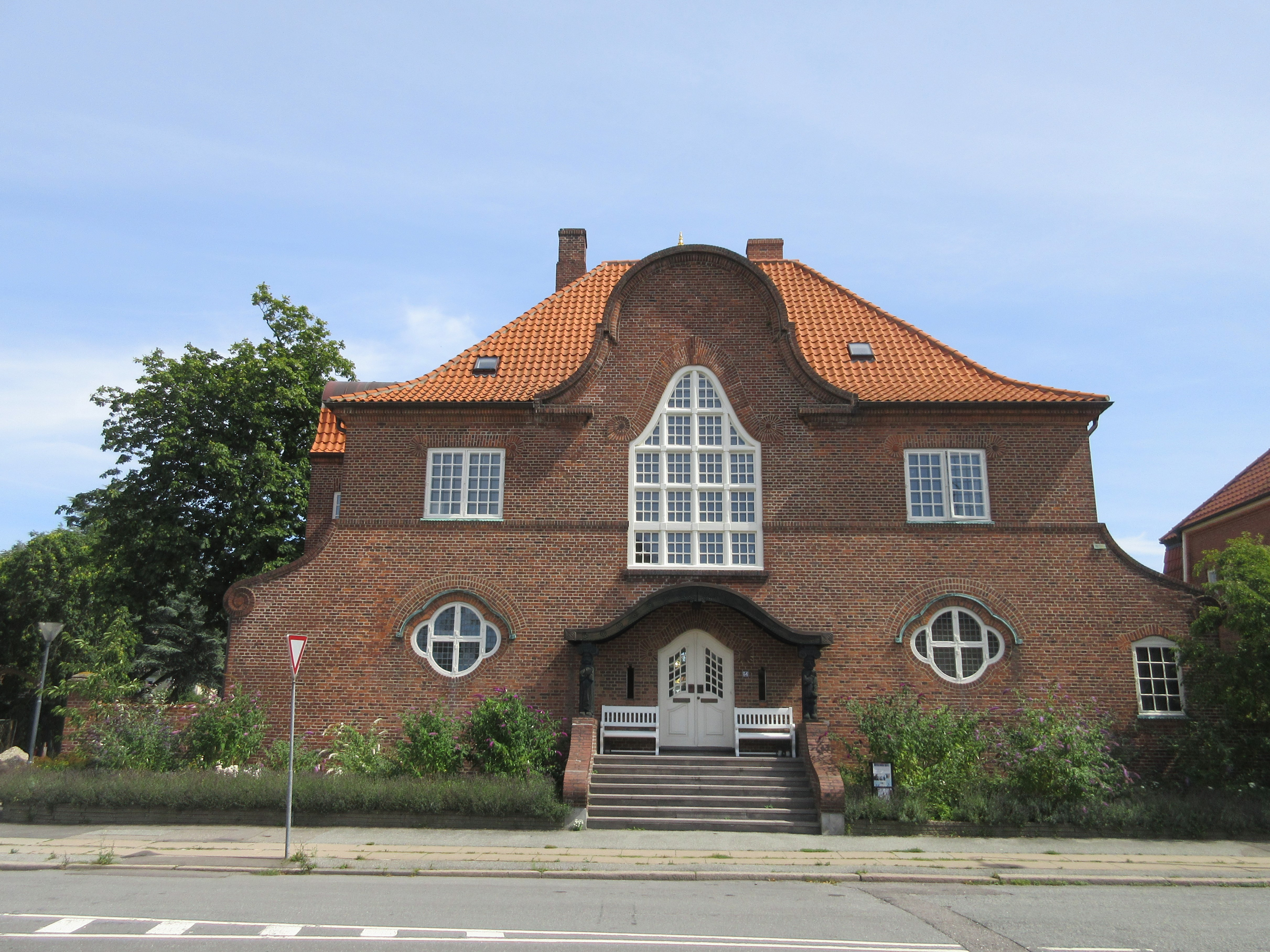
Knudsen's former home at Svanemøllevej 56 in Copenhagen.

Knudsen lived at Svanemøllevej 56 in the affluent Ruvangen neighbourhood of Copenhagen. The house was completed for Knudsen in 1904 to designs by the architect Carl Brummer.

Knudsen is one of the men seen in Peder Severin Krøyer's monumental 1904 oil-on-canvas group portrait painting Men of Industry. He died "mysteriously" from food poisoning while on a trip to India on 23 March 1920. He is buried in Hellerup Cemetery. His grave has been removed. A large memorial stone was unveiled in Følle in 1932.

== Awards ==
- Order of the Dannebrog (1900)
- Medal of Merit (1912)
