= Thun kramom =

Thun kramom (Thai: ทูลกระหม่อม) may refer to:

- Thun kramom, a Thai term of address used for royalty; see Thai royal ranks and titles
- Ubol Ratana, princess of Thailand, who is commonly referred to by this title
- Thoon Kramom (1866 ship), a Thai merchant ship and later naval training ship
- Thoon Kramom, other ships by the same name
