= Thoon Kramom =

The following ships have been named Thoon Kramom:

- Thoon Kramom (1866 ship), a Thai merchant ship, later used as a naval training ship
- Thoon Kramom (1919 ship), an East Asiatic Company merchant ship, built in Bangkok and registered in Copenhagen
