= MS Selandia =

Ship of the Danish East Asiatic Company

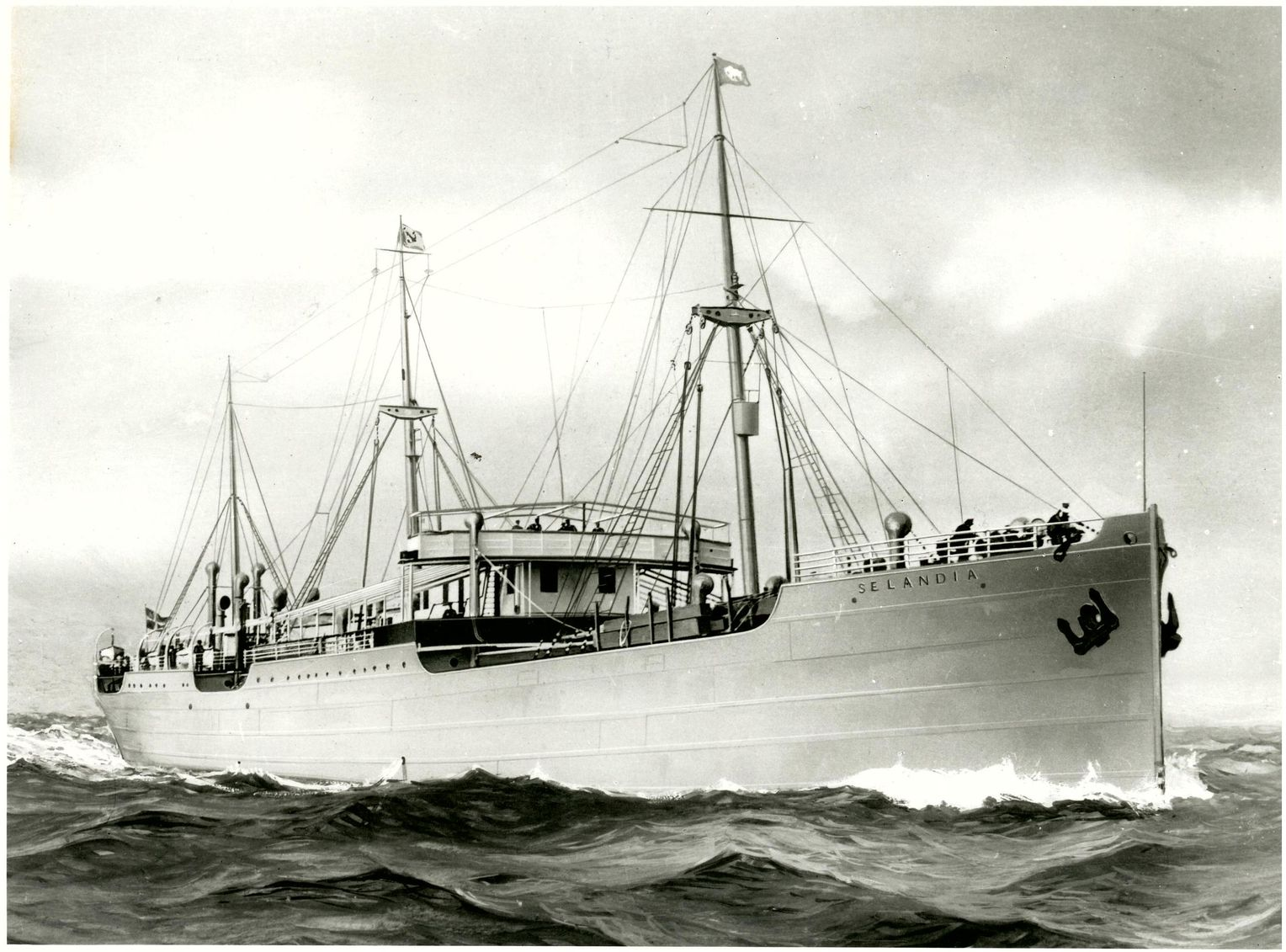
- MS Selandia

History
- Name: MS Selandia
- Namesake: Sjælland
- Owner: East Asiatic Company
- Route: between Scandinavia, Genoa, Italy, and Bangkok, Thailand
- Builder: Burmeister & Wain, Copenhagen
- Yard number: 276
- Launched: 4 November 1911
- Completed: February 1912
- Fate: Wrecked Omaisaki, Japan 26 January 1942

General characteristics
- Tonnage: 6,800 dwt; 4,964 GRT
- Length: 370 ft (112.8 m)
- Beam: 53 ft (16.2 m)
- Installed power: 2 x eight-cylinder, four-cycle, 1,250 hp diesel engines
- Propulsion: twin-screw
- Speed: 12 knots

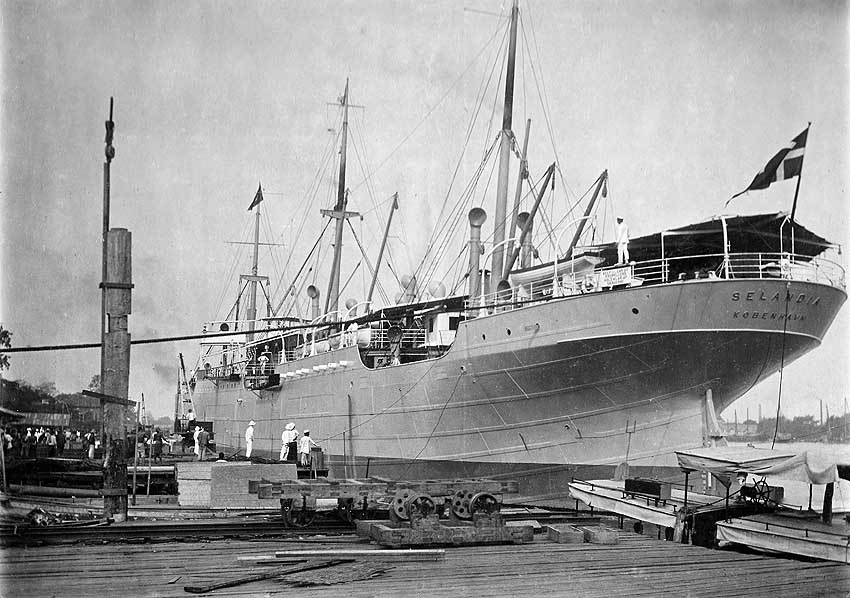
MS Selandia

Selandia (after the Latin name for the Danish island of Sjælland) was the name of three ships of the Danish East Asiatic Company, the best known of which, the first MS Selandia of 1912, was the most advanced ocean-going diesel motor ship of her time.

== Construction ==
Selandia and sister ship Fionia were results of negotiations between the Danish East Asiatic Company's president, Hans Niels Andersen, and Burmeister & Wain shipyards, Copenhagen, Denmark which had been introduced to the concept of marine diesel engines by engineer Ivar Knudsen, who led the ship's development. Negotiations were also underway for the Scottish firm of Barclay, Curle & Company to build Diesel motors on the Danish system and a third ship, to be a counterpart of Selandia and Fionia, named Jutlandia.

She was built at Burmeister & Wain in Copenhagen, and launched on 4 November 1911 before embarking on her maiden journey from Copenhagen to Bangkok on 22 February 1912. Selandia did not have a funnel; instead exhaust from her engines escaped through exhaust ports in the aft mast.

Built for cargo and passenger services between Scandinavia, Genoa, Italy, and Bangkok, Thailand, Selandia had "very ample and rather luxurious" cabins for 20 first class passengers, single-berth cabins of "exceptional size, with toilet and bath for every two cabins, and an extra feature is the servants' rooms, arranged in connection with private cabins."

She is frequently referred to as "the world's first large ocean-going diesel-powered ship", an "experiment," as previous powered vessels were driven by steam. The new motorships were described as "smokeless" and caused some to describe them as "phantom ships" with an incident during the trials for Selandia in which a captain of another ship ignored warnings and ran across her bows because he "saw no smoke." Some onlookers in London, perturbed by this new system, called it "the Devil Ship." The ship attracted curious crowds from London to San Francisco that were often skeptical of a deep ocean ship not powered by the commonly used triple expansion steam engine; yet within ten years there were over 2,000,000 deadweight capacity tons in commerce powered by diesel engines and British experts calculated the motorship had a 40% advantage in fuel costs, with fewer crew and steadier sea speeds.

There is evidence to say that the engine installation in Selandia was a world-first on numerous points, but she was not the world's first diesel-driven ocean-going ship, having been beaten to it by the Dutch tanker Vulcanus two years earlier.

== Service ==
Selandia was the largest and most advanced diesel-driven ship at the time of her maiden voyage by way of Aalborg to London in January 1912 after completing trials in Øresund. She arrived in London on 27 February at West India Docks during a coal strike where she attracted attention as the first large transoceanic ship independent of coal and was visited by Winston Churchill, then First Lord of the Admiralty. On her passage upriver assistance had been offered as none had before seen a large ship without a smokestack and thought she had suffered damage. From London Selandia sailed for Antwerp with cargo and a number of the prominent guests that had visited the ship in London as well as members of the press. From Antwerp the ship began a voyage to east Asian ports and was noteworthy for burning only 800 tons of fuel from Copenhagen to Bangkok whereas a coal burning ship would have required fuel taking up greatly more cubic space and dead weight.

She was sold to Panama in 1936 and renamed Norseman, and Tornator in 1940. 1941:Chartered to Yamashita Kisen (Steamship Co.) K.K. of Tokyo. The Finnish crew stays on board. Referred to in all official Japanese records as Tornator GO. Assigned to the Japan-Darien, Manchuria line.

== Later ships named Selandia ==
A second ship of the same name was built in 1938 and scrapped in 1962. The third Selandia, built in 1972, was sold to USA in 1994 and renamed USNS Gilliland in 1998. Tschudi & Eitzen Bulkers owned and operated a third vessel named Selandia,.

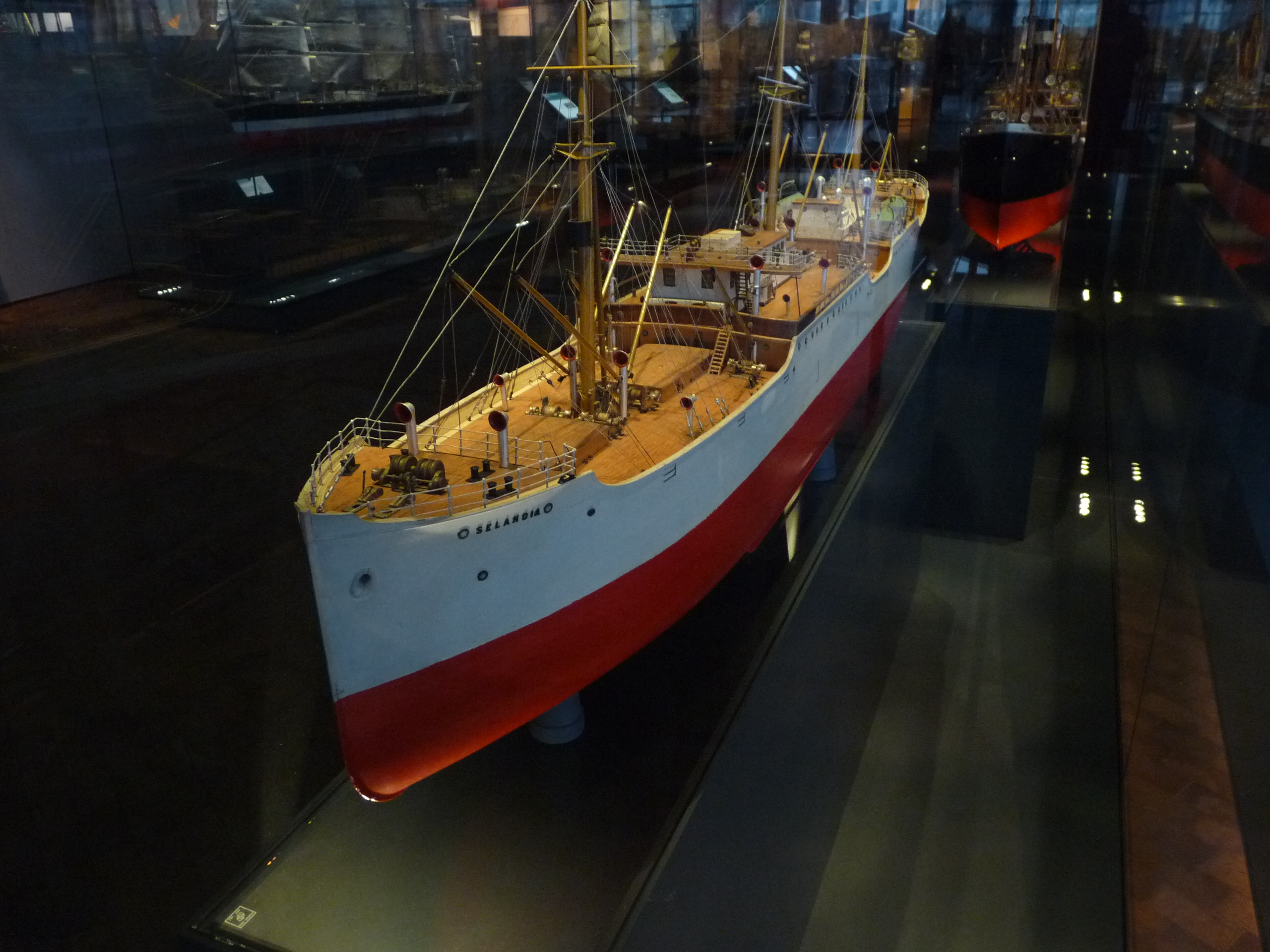
MS Selandia ship model in Frihedsmuseet, Copenhagen.

== Films ==
The Ship that Changed the World is a 60-minute drama documentary about the first oceangoing diesel-driven ship, M/S Selandia. The film was produced in 2012 by Chroma Film ApS, with executive producer Anders Dylov for the 100-year anniversary on 17 February of that year. It was directed by Michael Schmidt-Olsen.

== See also ==
- Ivar Knudsen
