= Hans Niels Andersen =

Danish shipping magnate, businessman and diplomat

Hans Niels Andersen RE SK
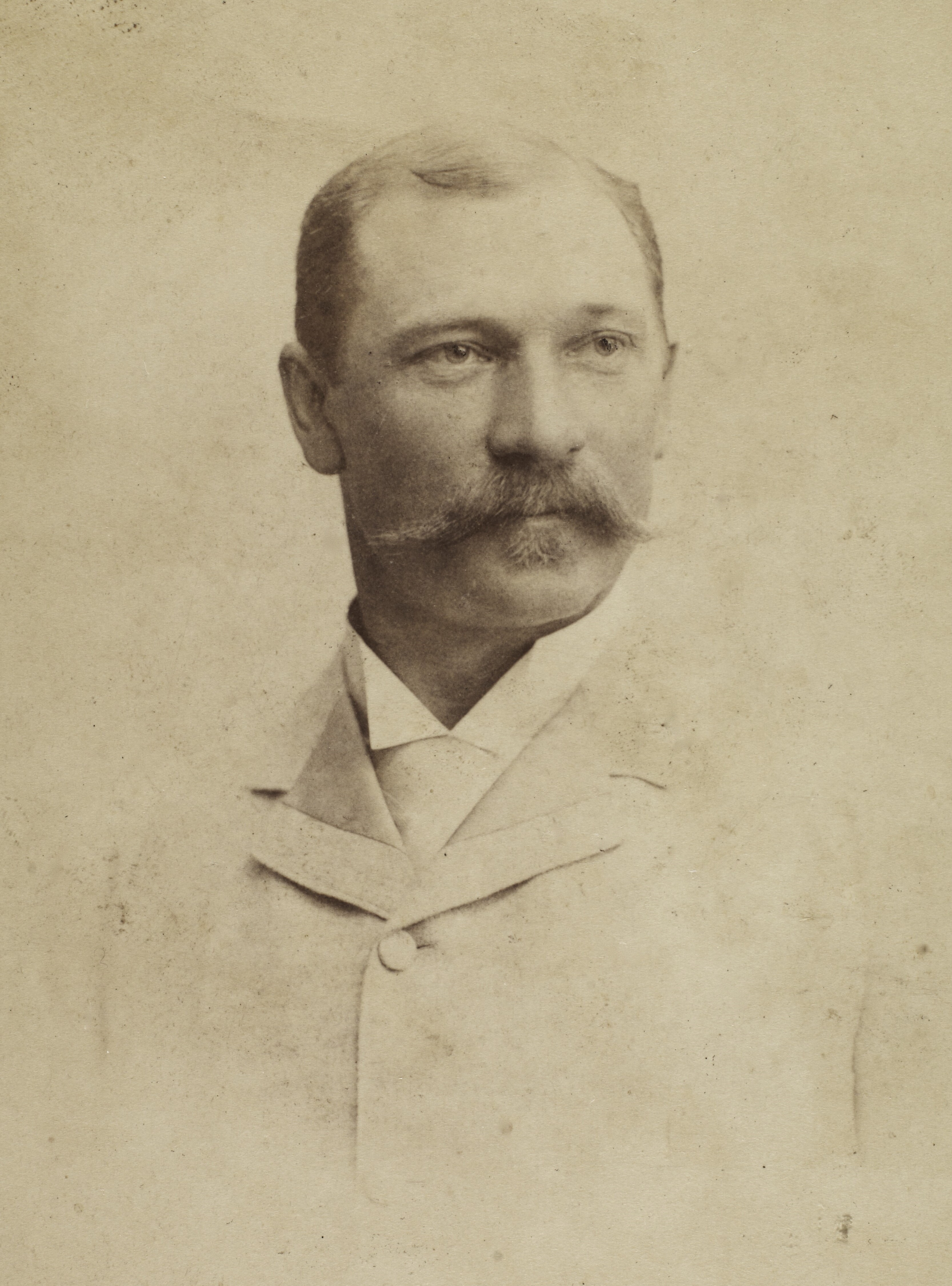
- Born: 10 September 1852; Nakskov, Denmark
- Died: 30 December 1937 (aged 85)
- Occupations: Shipping magnate, businessman
- Known for: Founder of the East Asiatic Company
- Awards: Knight of the Elephant

Hans Niels Andersen (10 September 1852 – 30 December 1937) was a Danish shipping magnate, businessman, diplomat and founder of the East Asiatic Company.

== Early life ==
Born into a working-class family in Nakskov, he trained as a shipbuilder before hiring on as a ship's carpenter in 1872. He came to Bangkok for the first time in 1873 and advanced to first mate and later master of Thoon Kramom, a ship owned by Chulalongkorn, the king of Siam. Subsequently, he entered the freight business in East Asia and later Europe.

== Business ==
In 1884 he started his own company in Bangkok, Andersen & Co., which encompassed import/export, shipping, logging and sawmills.

Returning to Copenhagen, he opened a branch office of his company and in 1897, together with Isak Glückstadt, director of the Danish Farmers' Bank, founded the East Asiatic Company with an initial equity of 3.5 million Danish kroner. Its original purpose was to facilitate trade between Denmark and the Far East, but it continued to grow, diversifying into shipbuilding, marine propulsion, insurance, etc., until it eventually became the largest company in Denmark.

In 1912, Andersen commissioned the Copenhagen shipbuilding company Burmeister & Wain to build the MS Selandia, the world's first oceangoing motorship. The East Asiatic Company expanded further, opening branch offices all over the world, reaching 250 enterprises in over 50 countries.

Andersen remained in the position of executive director for four decades. At the time of his death, in 1937, the aggregate turnover of the company was exceeding 233 million kroner.

== Diplomacy ==
During World War I, in which Denmark remained neutral, he was entrusted by the Danish Foreign Minister, Erik Scavenius, with missions to several countries with the purpose of finding an end to the conflict. Andersen, who was an intimate friend of the Danish royal family, was well versed in dealing with royalty. He hoped to appeal the British king George V and the Russian czar Nikolai II who, along with the Danish king Christian X, were all first cousins. He attempted unsuccessfully to initiate peace negotiations, but more successfully to secure Danish interests.

Andersen, who was sympathetic to the Allies, was most likely unaware that his diplomatic mission for peace was proposed to the Danish government by the German authorities, who were trying to probe ways to get Russia out of the war, so they could concentrate their efforts on the Western Front.

He was Siam's Consul General in Denmark 1898–1932, became titular Councilor of State (Danish: etatsråd) in 1900, and was created Knight of the Elephant, the highest Danish order, in 1919.
