= Hans Heinrich Baumgarten =

Danish industrialist

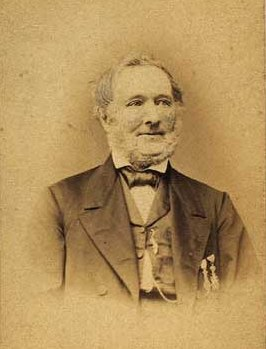
- Baumgarten photographed by H. Lehmann, Berlin
- Born: 29 May 1806; Halstenbek, Holstein
- Died: 3 March 1875 (aged 68); Kongens Lyngby, Denmark
- Occupation: Industrialist
- Awards: Knight in the Order of the Dannebrog, 1863

Hans Heinrich Baumgarten (29 May 1806 – 3 March 1875) was a Holstein-Danish industrialist. In 1843, he founded a company which from 1846 became known as Baumgarten & Burmeister and after his retirement became Burmeister & Wain.

== Early life and career ==
Baumgarten was born on 29 May 1806 in Halstenbeck, Holstein, the son of Hufner Franz Heinrich Joachim B. (1757–1826) and Anna Marie Köncke (1763–1820). He started as a farm worker in his home town but later apprenticed as a koiner in Hamburg. He moved to Copenhagen in 1829 where he was introduced to mechanics in Frederik Schiøtt's machine workshop. Baumgarten went abroad When Schiøtt's firm was dissolved in 1832. He first managed an iron foundry in Lübeck for a few years and then continued to Berlin where he first worked for three years as a mechanic in Vossische Zeitung's printer business and then for about a year as foreman Freund's machine factory. In 1865, Burmeister made William Wain a partner in the company.

In 1839, Baumgarten return to Copenhagen. He initially worked for a short time as engineer in Berling's printer and then for a few years managed P. F. Lunde's machine workshop.

== Baumgarten & Burmeister ==
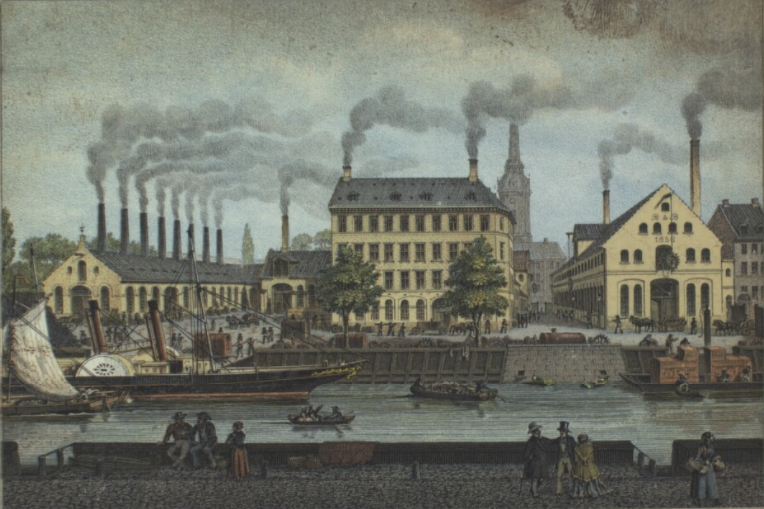
Baumgarten & Burmeister

On 18 February 1843, Baumgarten was granted a royal license to establish his own machine workshop. His first workshop was located at the second floor in a rear wing at Købmagergade 46. It later moved to the so-called Wismer House on Gammel Mønt.

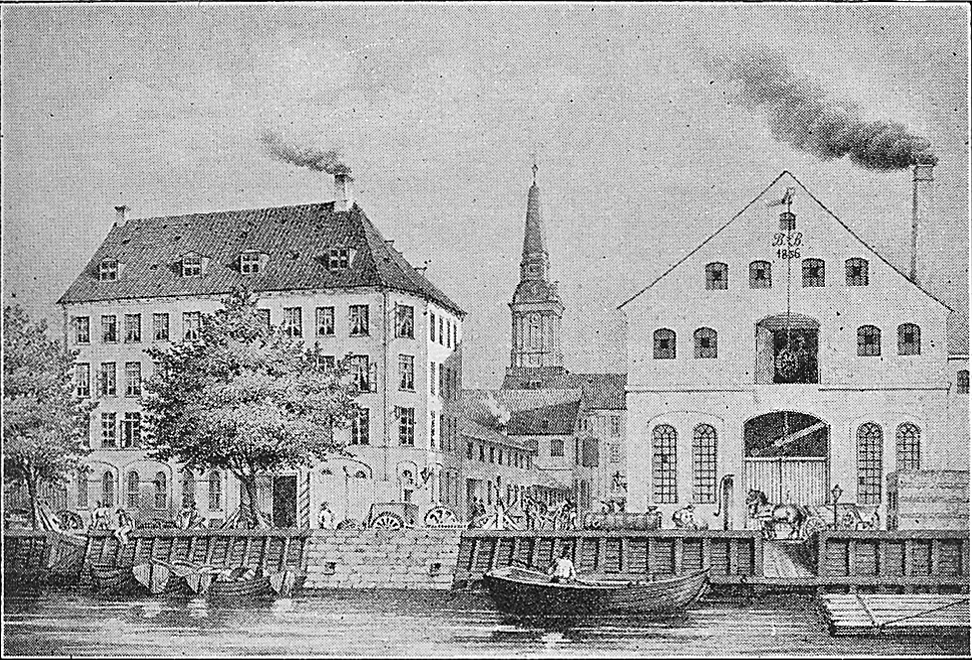
Baumgarten & Burmeister

In October 1846, Baumgarten and C. C. Burmeister merged their ventures Baumgarten & Burmeister after being encouraged to do so by Hans Christian Ørsted. The company was based in the former beer garden "Kierulffs Have" at Overgaden neden Vandet in Christianshavn. Baumgarten retired from the company in 1862. It had by then grown to 450 workers and had produced a total of 134 steam engines.

Baumgarten was a board member of Industriforeningen in 1846–60.

== Personal life ==
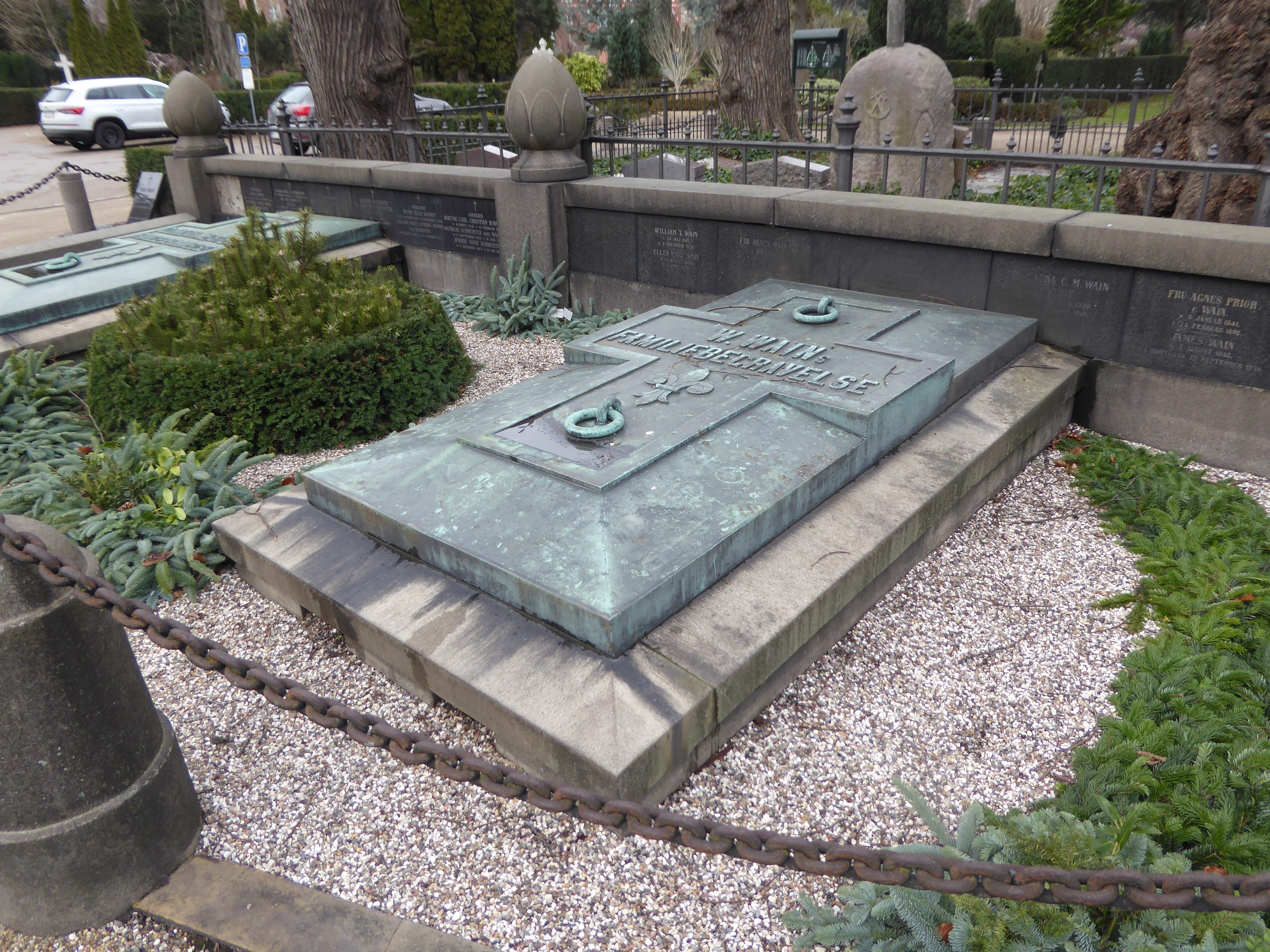
Baumgarten's grave in Assistens Cemetery in Copenhagen

Baumgarten married Frederikke Margrethe Andersen (17 June 1810 - 18 March 1896), a daughter of Thue Andersen and Anne Marie Svendsen, on 29 October 1830. They had two children, Ludwig Ferdinand Baumgarten and Emma Vilhelmine Wendt. Their son died as an infant.

In 1863, Baumgarten was created a Knight in the Order of the Dannebrog. He spent his last years on his property in Lyngby where he constructed a machine for the perforation of sheets of stamps. He died on 3 March 1875 and is buried in Assistens Cemetery in Copenhagen.
