= Paknam incident =

1893 naval battle of the Franco-Siamese crisis

Paknam Incident
- Part of the 1893 Franco-Siamese crisis
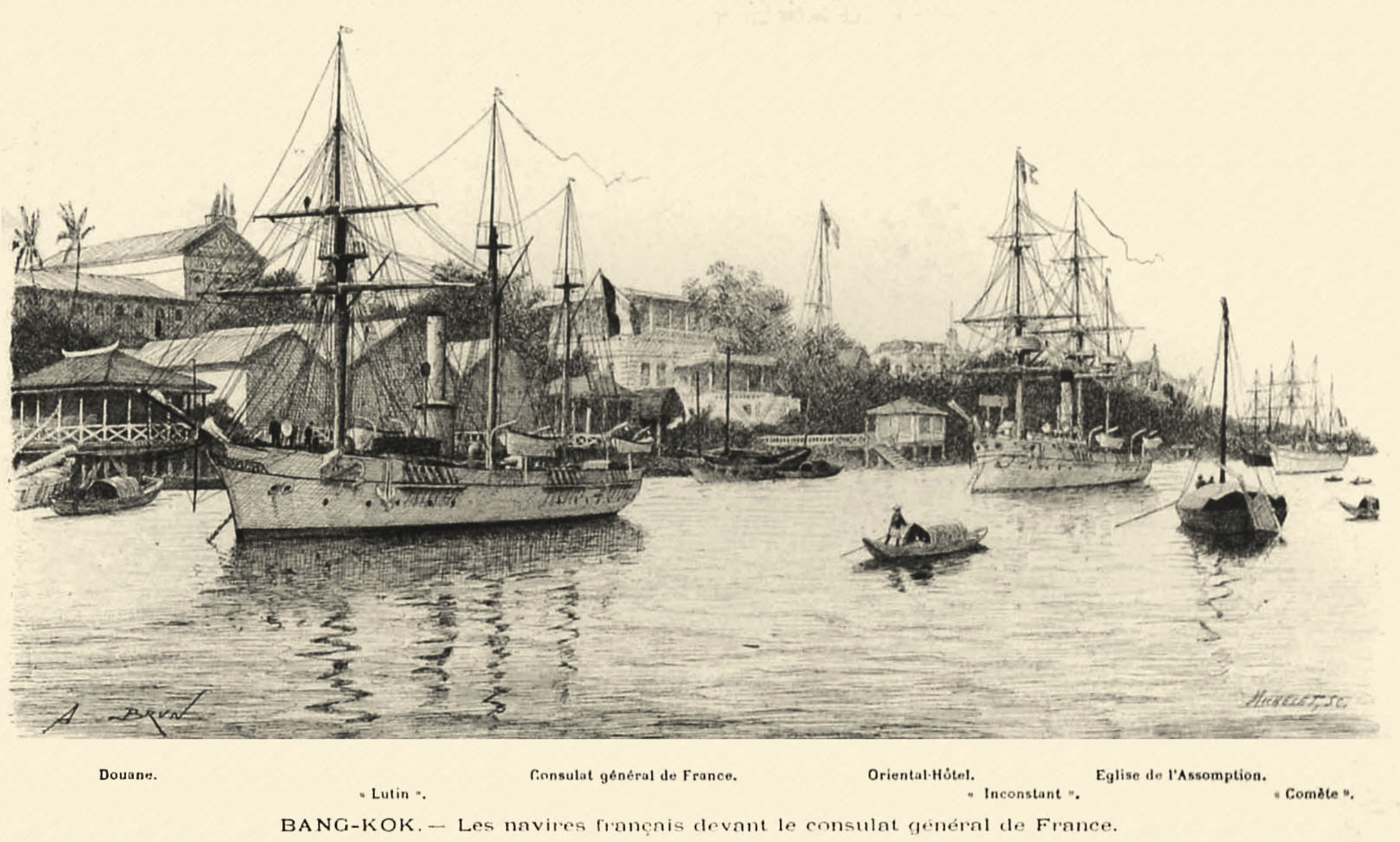
- Illustration in the L'Illustration, showing the French ships anchored at the legation
Date	13 July 1893
Location	Paknam, Siam, Chao Phraya River 13.537941°N 100.583600°E
Result	French victory

Belligerents
French Republic	(Thailand) Kingdom of Siam

Commanders and leaders
(French Third Republic) Captain Borey	(Thailand) Andreas du Plessis de Richelieu

Strength
1 aviso 1 gunboat 1 steamer	Land: 10 artillery pieces 2 forts Sea: 2 gunboats 2 gun flats 1 barque

Casualties and losses
3 killed 3 wounded	16 killed 20 wounded

The Paknam Incident was a military engagement fought during the Franco-Siamese crisis in July 1893. While sailing off Paknam on Siam's Chao Phraya River, three French ships violated Siamese territory and a Siamese fort and a force of gunboats fired warning shots. In the ensuing battle, France won and blockaded Bangkok, which ended the war.

== Background ==
Siamese territorial claims before the incident

Conflict arose when the French Navy aviso Inconstant and the gunboat Comete arrived on 13 July at Paknam with the intention of crossing the bar into the Chao Phraya River and join the French gunboat Lutin already anchored off the French embassy in Bangkok. The Siamese forbade the French gunboats to cross the bar, a contravention of the Franco-Siamese Treaty of 1856 which permitted the French free passage up as far as Paknam Island. The French commander, Captain Borey, did not receive a telegram of updated instructions from Paris to hold his position at the mouth of the river, as it was not received by the French consul Auguste Pavie until the following day. But Pavie did advise him of the Siamese stance and suggested he anchor off Koh Sichang and await further instructions. Borey was under pressure since his ships could only cross the bar at high tide and chose to follow his orders from Rear Admiral Edgar Humann in Saigon rather than Pavie's counsel.

Siamese territorial claims after the incident

The French in Bangkok believed that the Siamese were well-prepared for battle. Chulachomklao Fort had just been modernized with seven 6-inch Armstrong Whitworth disappearing guns and was under the command of Andreas du Plessis de Richelieu, a Danish naval officer granted the noble title of Phraya Chonlayutyothin. Further upriver at Paknam Island, the smaller Phi Seua Samut fortress had also been fitted with three of the same guns. The Siamese had also sunk mines, barrels of gas, and dynamite in the river, from below the fort to the center of the river. Above this, two chain and stake barrages plus several sunken vessels off both banks left only a narrow passage available to the French.

Reports are contradictory about the strength of Siamese naval forces that day. Contemporary French accounts suggest that five gunboats were anchored just beyond the sunken vessels, almost the entire Siamese fleet. Herbert Warington Smyth who visited Paknam that day disputes this, reporting that only the Siamese gunboats Makut Ratchakuman and Coronation were present, together with "two very old-fashioned gun flats with a big gun each, and the training barque, (Note: This is the Thoon Kramom (1866 ship).) lying farther up river, armed with six brass carronades for saluting purposes".

== Incident ==
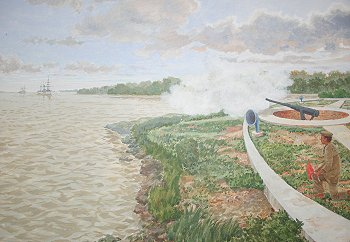
Chulachomklao Fort firing on the French ships

The French chose to cross the bar with the high tide just after sunset on 13 July. The weather was overcast and raining. By this time the Siamese were on high alert and at battle stations. The French ships were led by the small mail steamer Jean Baptiste Say. At 18:15 the rain stopped and the Siamese gunners observed the French ships passing the nearby lighthouse. A few minutes later, the French were off Black Buoy when they entered the range of the fort's guns. Siamese gunners were ordered to fire three warning shots; if they were ignored, then a fourth shot would signal their gunboats to open fire.

At 18:30, the Phra Chulachomklao Fort opened fire with two blank rounds but the French continued on, so a third, live, warning shot was fired and hit the water in front of the Jean Baptiste Say. When this warning was ignored, a fourth shot was fired so the gunboats Makhut Ratchakuman and Coronation opened up at 18:50. Inconstant returned fire on the fort while the Comete engaged the gunboats. At least two shots from fortress hit the Inconstant, but more effective action was prevented by a lack of training at the fort. Under Richelieu's direct command at the fort were three other Danes. Two of them were recent arrivals who spoke no Siamese. By Warington-Smyth's account "these officers were running breathlessly to their guns in turn up and down half-finished steps and gun-platforms, avoiding pitfalls as best they might, and communicating their orders in languages which none of the astonished gunners understood." It was a similar situation aboard the Siamese gunboats where the Siamese crews lacked any training, so their Danish commanders ran back-and-forth to lay and fire the guns, then back to the bridge to steer the ship and instruct the engine room. After firing two shots the carriage of the 70-pound gun aboard the Coronation broke through the deck and could no longer be fired. In the ensuing confusion the Coronation was nearly rammed by the Inconstant which fired two shells into the Coronation. The Jean Baptiste Say was hit several times by cannon fire and the captain was forced to ground her on Laem Lamphu Rai. No shells hit the Phra Chulachomklao Fort. Within 25 minutes the Inconstant and the Comete had broken through the line of Siamese defences at a cost of fifteen Siamese and two French lives. A short time later the ships passed the Phi Seua fortress at Paknam. By this time night had fallen and after "five minutes' desultory firing of the wildest kind" the gunboats passed unhindered. Warington-Smyth reports that a civilian woman in Paknam was struck and killed by a stray bullet from this skirmish.

== Aftermath ==
Siam after incident

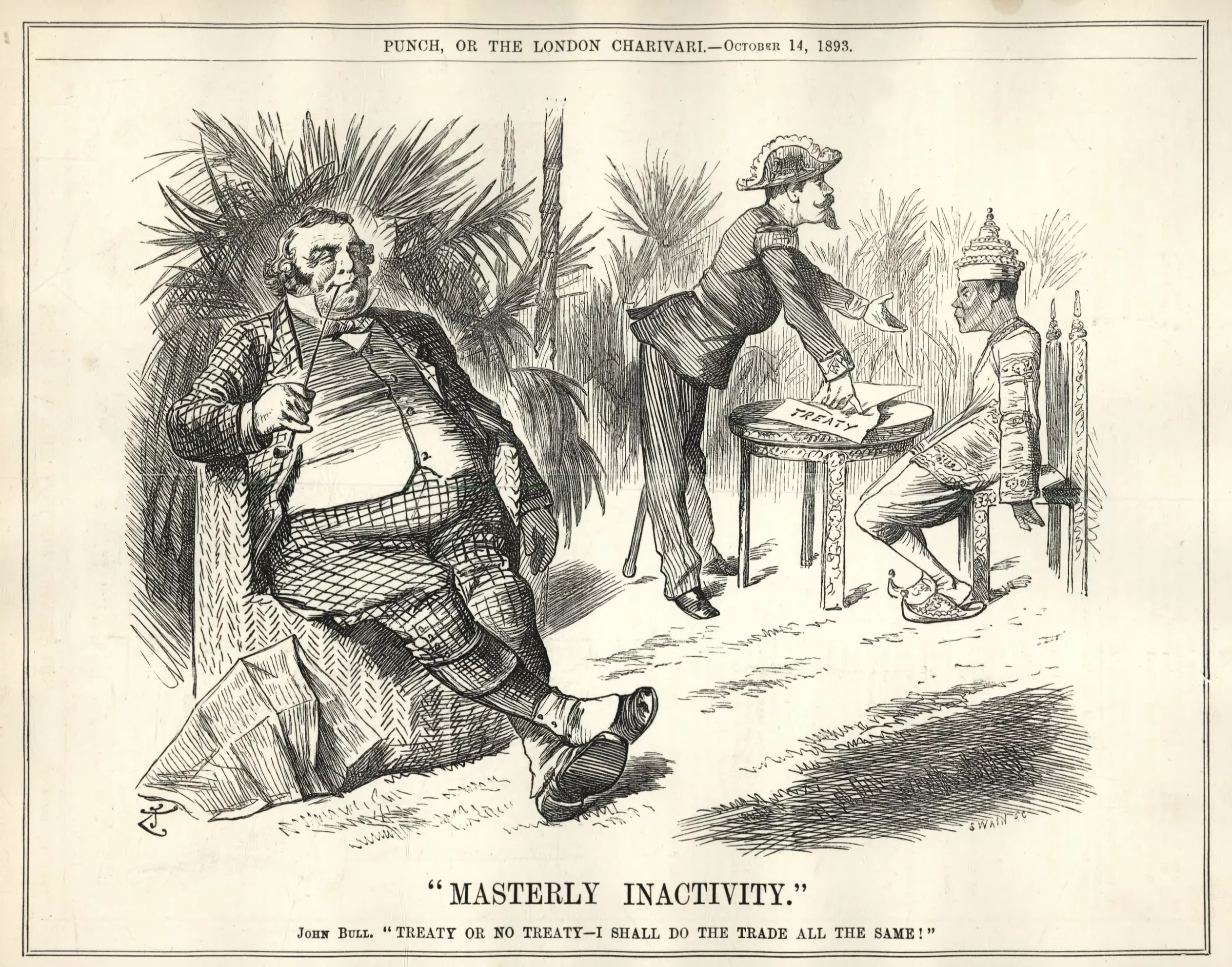
Franco-Siamese Treaty 1893, Masterly Inactivity John Bull caricature

The following morning, Jean Baptiste Say's crew was still aboard their grounded vessel so the Siamese sent a boat and captured the steamer. They then attempted to sink her, but failed. The prisoners were treated badly according to French reports but again this is refuted by Warington Smyth. A day later, the French gunboat Forfait arrived at Paknam and sent a boatload of sailors to recapture the mail steamer, but when they boarded the Siamese defenders repelled their attack.

Captain Borey had anchored off the French Embassy in Bangkok around 22:00 on 13 July. His ships' guns were targeted on the royal palace to put pressure on the Siamese to resolve multiple territorial disputes that had arisen with France. The Siamese were widely seen as having overplayed their hand in the dispute. By attempting to prevent the French from entering the Chao Phraya River, the Siamese had contravened the 1856 Franco-Siamese Treaty, giving the French a pretext for their subsequent actions. The French gunboats, together with Pavie, departed Bangkok on 24 July prior to the French imposing a blockade of the river from 29 July until 3 August. In France, many were calling for a protectorate to be imposed upon Siam. But the events of 13 July, followed by the blockade, which harmed British interests far more than French (British trade accounted for 93% of Siam exports), alarmed the British, who put pressure on both the Siamese and French governments to reach a negotiated settlement. The final agreement gave the French control of substantial territories east of the Mekong river, territory that today forms most of Laos. Furthermore, a 25 km-wide military-exclusion zone was established on the right bank of the Mekong and around Battambang and Siem Reap, weakening Siamese control of these territories, and the French were given temporary control of the port of Chanthaburi). Finally, the Siamese were forced to pay three million French francs or 2.11 million baht (10.5 billion baht adjusted for inflation) indemnity to the French. The final agreement was signed on 3 October 1893.

== Gallery ==
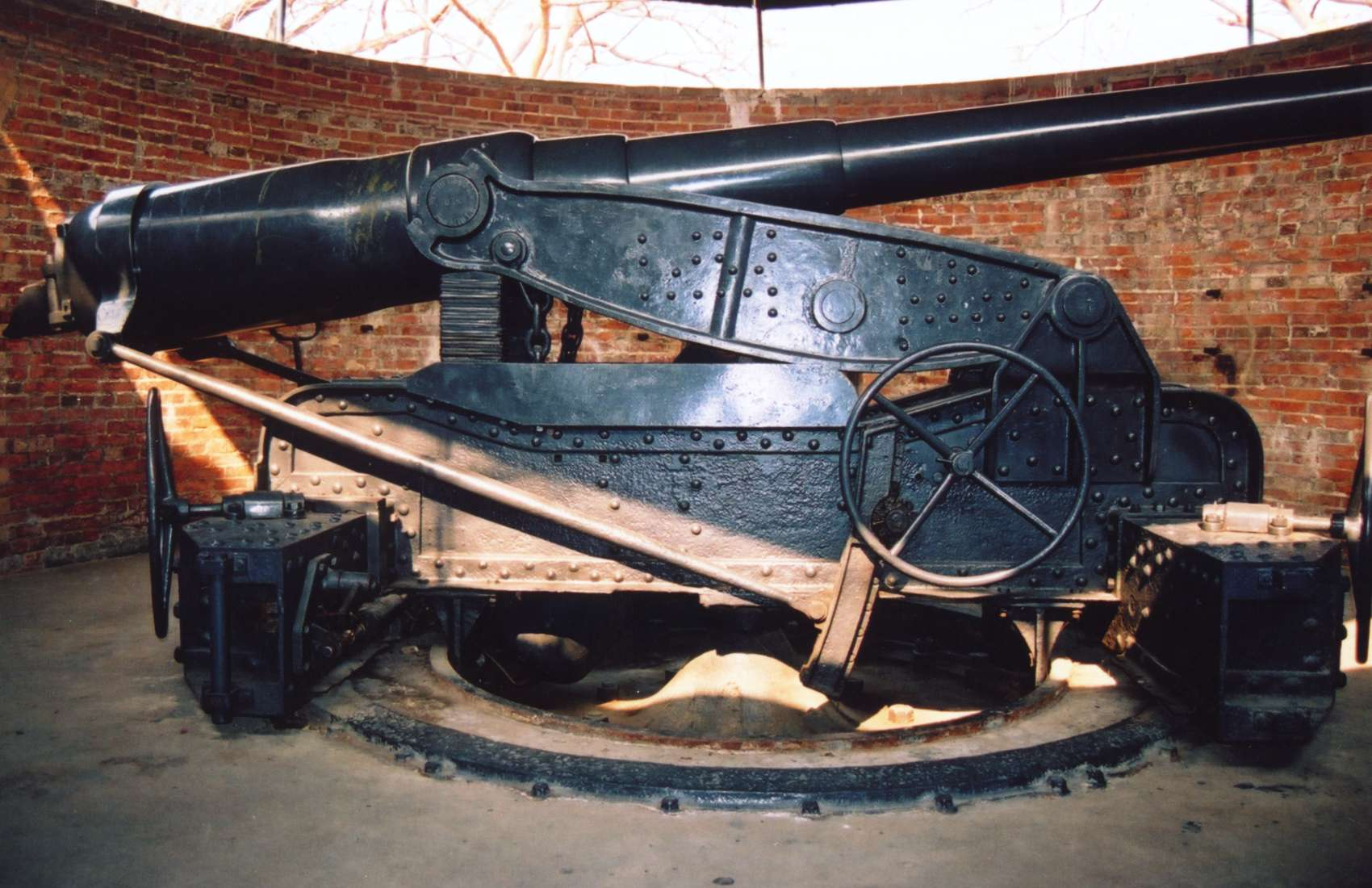
A 6-inch disappearing gun, Chulachomklao Fort

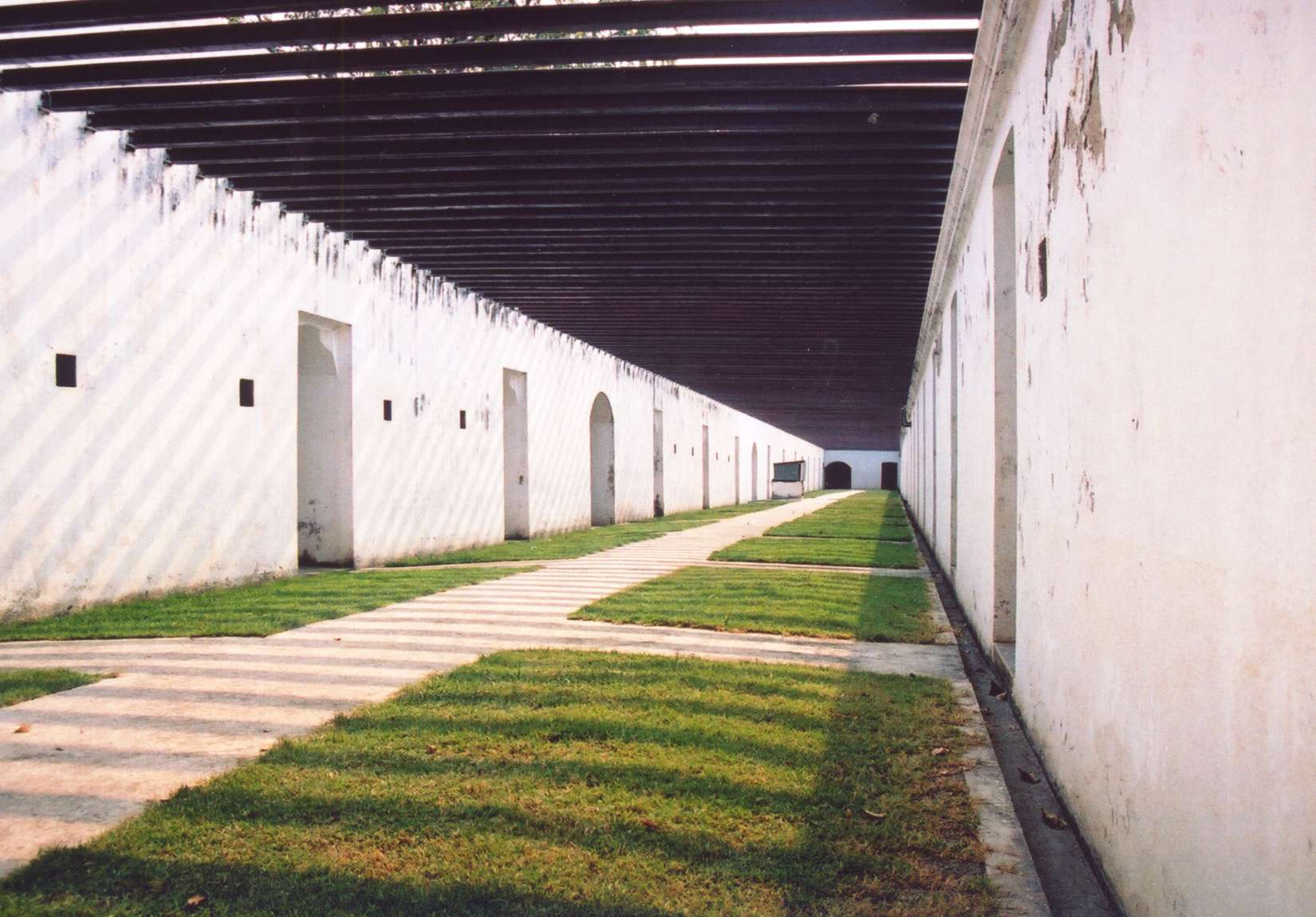
Inside the Siamese fort

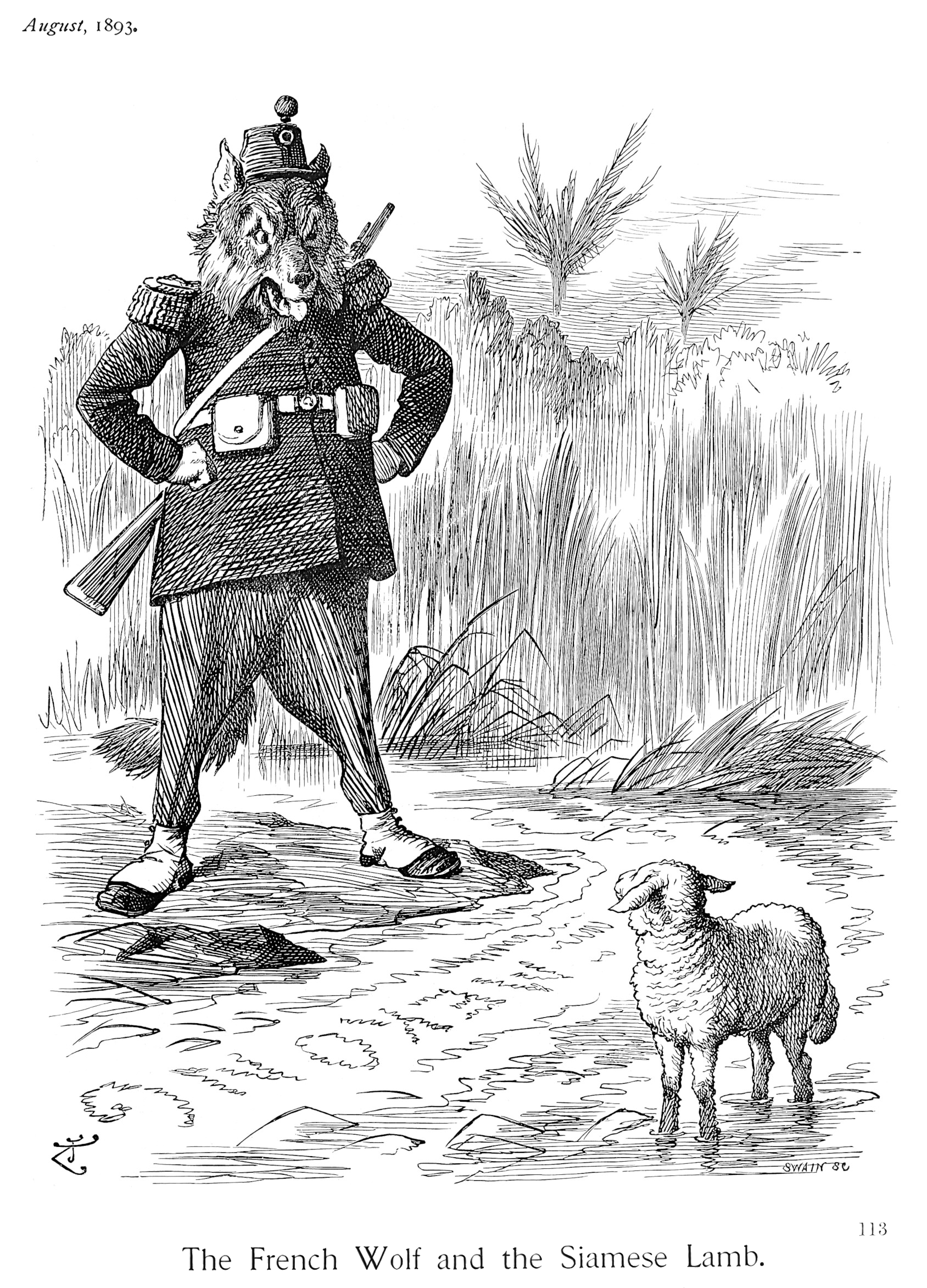
Cartoon expressing the power imbalance and British satire

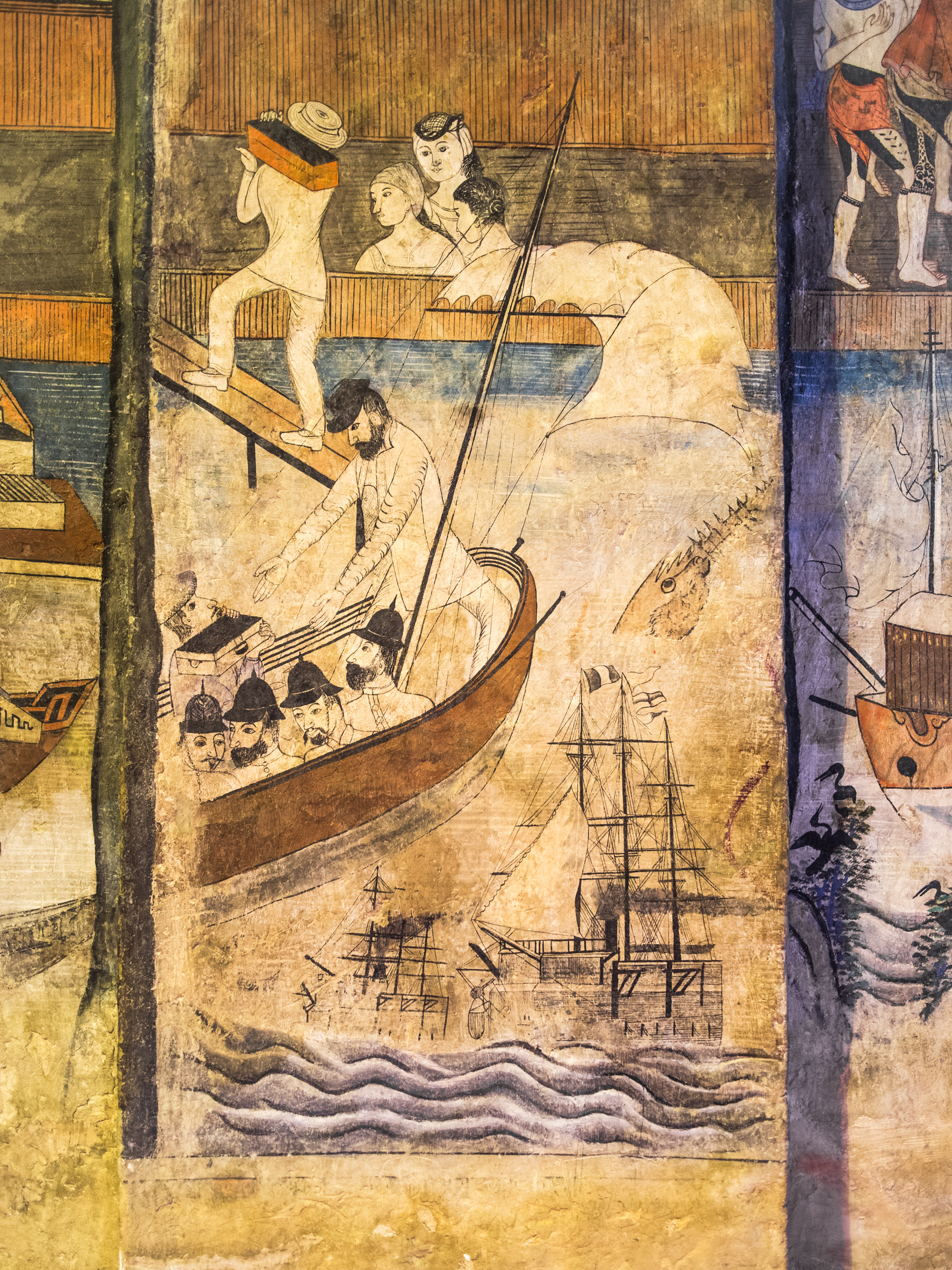
A temple mural of Wat Phumin, Nan, Thailand, shows the French warships

== See also ==
- Cochinchina campaign
- Tonkin campaign
