= EAC Invest A/S =

Multinational relocation service company

- House flag
- Formerly: East Asiatic Company; Santa Fe Group
- Type: Aktieselskab
- Industry: Investment
- Founded: 1897; 129 years ago in Copenhagen, Denmark
- Founder: Hans Niels Andersen
- Headquarters: Copenhagen, Denmark
- Subsidiaries: Russian East Asiatic; Siam Steam Navigation; Est Asiatique Francais; Swedish East Asiatic; D/S A/S Orient

The EAC Invest A/S, formerly known as the Santa Fe Group and East Asiatic Company (Danish: Det Østasiatiske Kompagni or ØK) is a multinational holding and investment company, based in Copenhagen, Denmark. Originally founded by Hans Niels Andersen in 1897.

It owned 5 subsidiary companies: Russian East Asiatic based in Saint Petersburg, Siam Steam Navigation based in Bangkok, Est Asiatique Francais based in Paris, Swedish East Asiatic based in Gothenburg, and D/S A/S Orient based in Copenhagen.

== History ==
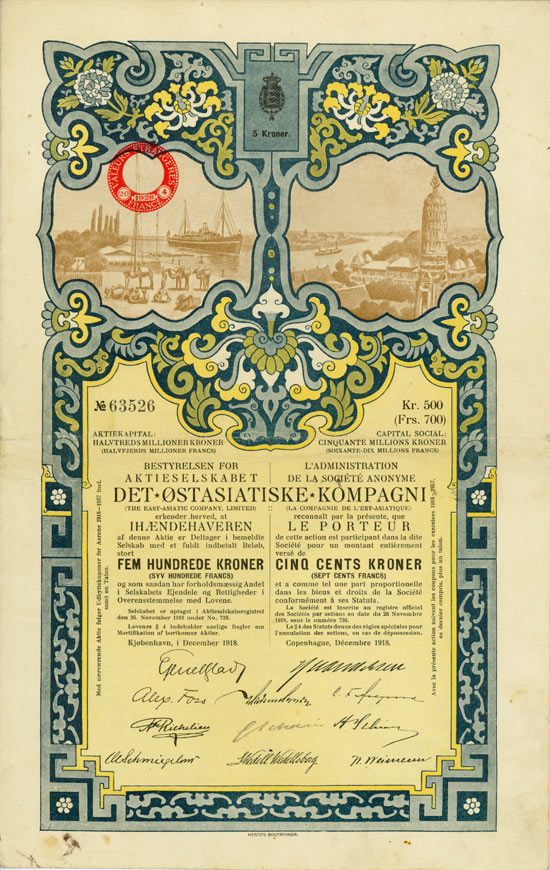
Share of the Det Østasiatiske Kompagni, issued December 1918

=== Background ===
The Ensign of the company.

The East Asiatic Company (Danish: Det Østasiatiske Kompagni or ØK) was founded by Hans Niels Andersen in Copenhagen in 20 March 1897 on the basis of Hans' previous company Andersen & Co. Anderson & Co was established in 1884 with Danish Andreas du Plessis de Richelieu. Together, their company owned and operated the Oriental Hotel in Bangkok, which became the first foreign hotel in Thailand; it also was the main supplier to the Siamese Marine Forces which Richelieu headed.

He had bought the Oriental Hotel in Bangkok with Captain Peter Andersen in 1884. They would go out renovating the premises after borrowing 40,000 Danish Crowns from the Borneo Company. Being one of the only hotels in Bangkok at the time, the hotel attracted sailors and officers from foreign ships who were staying in the city.

=== Formation ===
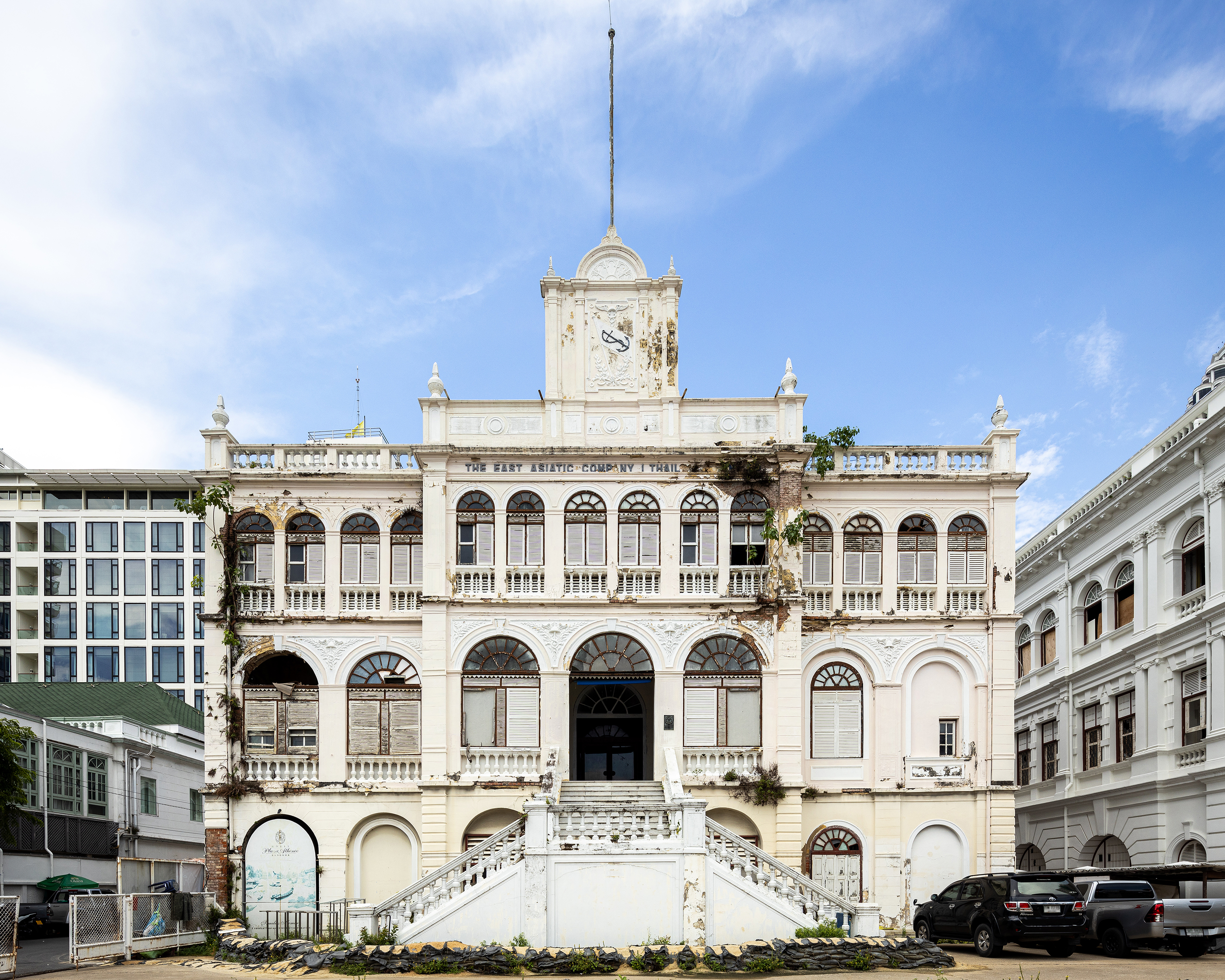
East Asiatic Company in Bangkok

Andersen managed to secure funding from Isak Glueckstadt. Isak was the financier and manager director of the largest bank in Northern Europe, Landmandsbanken. The company grew from the teak tree concessions it had bought in Siam and operated direct lines from Bangkok to Europe. Service which would eventually include both passenger and freight lines between the Danish capital, Bangkok and the far east was the initial objective. Routes to include the Baltic and Black Seas were established when in 1899, the subsidiary Russian American Line Co. of St. Petersburg was formed.

Europe-Asia operations widened when the firm, Est Asiatique Francais of Paris, followed in 1902, the new Danish West Indian Company, in 1905 and the Siam Steam Navigation Company, in 1908. The second of these was eventually renamed Thai Navigation Co. after the Thai government took it over in 1941. For trade in the South of Africa, the Swedish East India Company later began regular trips. The subsidiary Russian American Line began sailing to North America in 1916, continuing until 1917. Another, the Baltic American Line, continued the service under the Danish flag from 1921 to 1930. EAC was also involved in shipping for hire with tramp operations beginning in 1915 under the subsidiary D/S A/S Orient of Copenhagen.

In 1905, the company acquired Water Island in the Caribbean from the Danish state, but eventually sold it to the United States government in 1944, during the German occupation of Denmark.

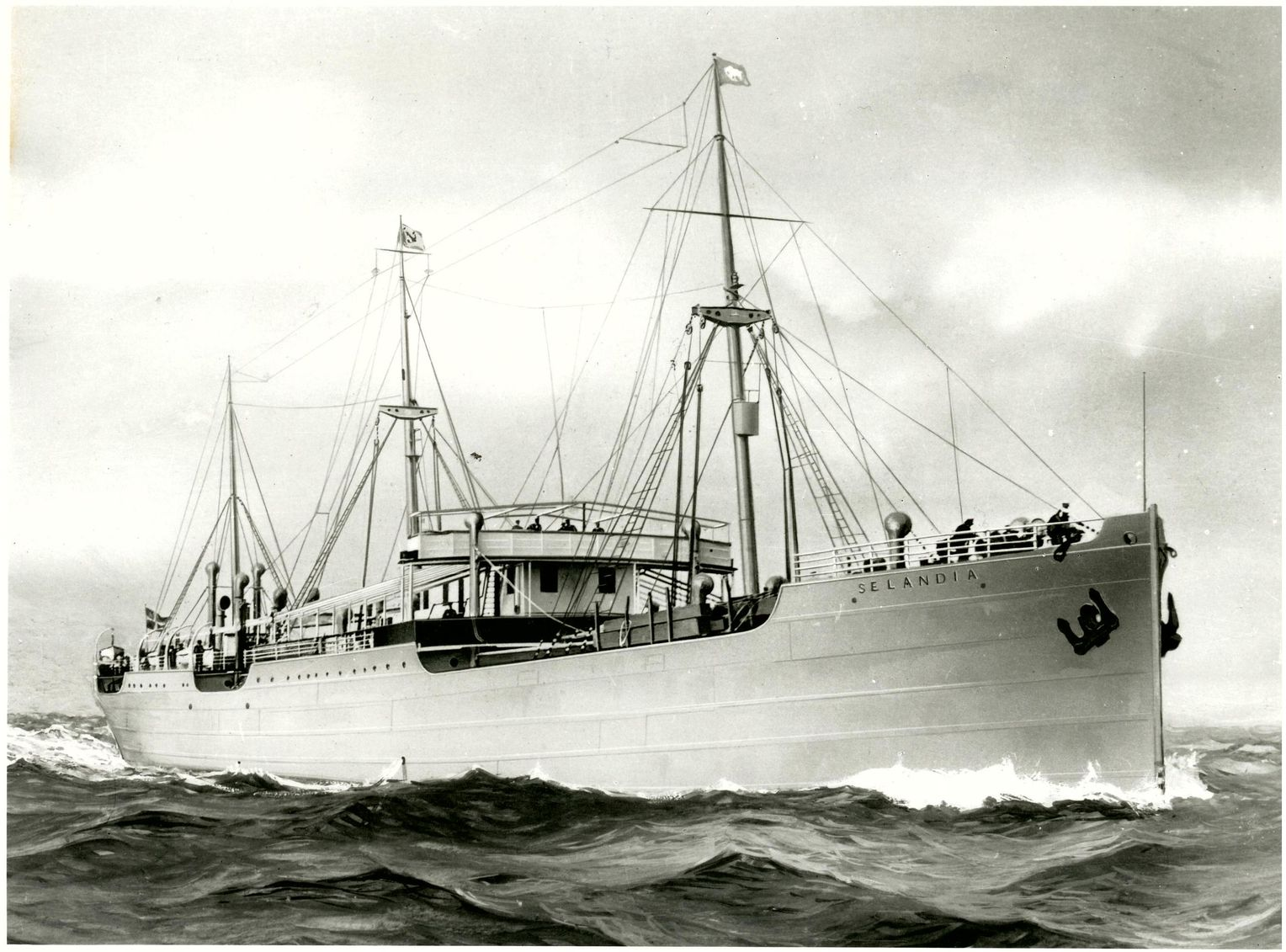
MS Selandia

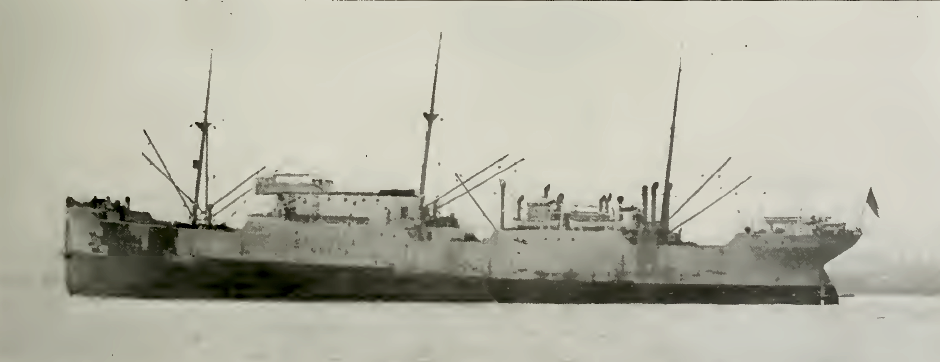
MS Jutlandia

The company was a pioneer in development of large, commercial motorships with President Andersen placing an order with Burmeister & Wain, headed by the engineer and diesel marine engine pioneer, Ivar Knudsen, for two motorships, MS Selandia and MS Fionia, to be built by that firm. Selandia began operation in 1912 after its maiden voyage with the Danish crown prince and princess aboard followed by a visit to London where the ship stimulated great interest with visits by Winston Churchill, admirals and influential shipping figures who then remained aboard for a voyage to Antwerp. A third contracted ship, MS Jutlandia, was built in Britain by Barclay, Curle & Company and became the second large motorship in commercial service with any company. By 1935 the company was operating twenty-seven motorships, including a new MS Jutlandia.

In these middle years, business grew considerably. The United Baltic Corporation was formed as a partnership with Andrew Weir & Co. in 1919. The early 1920s saw services extend from Copenhagen to South Africa, Cuba, Australia, Mexico and North Pacific ports. New York and, later, Philadelphia, Baltimore or Norfolk, Virginia were among the ports of call added for ships on the north Pacific route in 1940. Connections between Vancouver and the far east were handled by Johnson Walton Steamships Ltd of Vancouver, when they were acquired in 1949.

=== Post-war ===
During the Second World War, several of its ships were sunk, mostly torpedoed in the Atlantic by German U-boats.

After the war, with air travelling becoming increasing popular, the company sold numerous ships in the 1950s and 1960s before discontinuing its entire passenger fleet's operations in 1969. Their last ship, Fionia, was sold to Swiss buyers and renamed MCS Schaula.

In April 2015, the company rebranded itself as the Santa Fe Group, and changed its listing on the Copenhagen Stock Exchange to the ticker reference SFG. From 2016 to 2019, the group's share lost 94% of its value, and its revenue shrunk 23% year-on-year. In September 2019, the Santa Fe Group was sold to Proventus Capital Partners for 1 million euros after it failed to regain a financial health. Technically, the ownership of the Santa Fe Group was transferred to Santa Fe Intressenter, a company controlled by Lazarus Equity Partners and backed by Proventus. Its Australian subsidiary had already been sold in a management buyout in December 2018. In November 2019, the Santa Fe Group became EAC Invest.

== Bibliography ==
- Knudsen, Ivar (1914). "A Smokeless Marine". The American–Scandinavian Review. 2 (1). American–Scandinavian Foundation: 21–28.
- Pacific Marine Review (1935). "New Motorship Jutlandia". Pacific Marine Review. XXXII (3). San Francisco: J.S. Hines.
- The Ships List
