= Thoon Kramom (1866 ship) =

Thai merchant and naval ship (1866–1903)

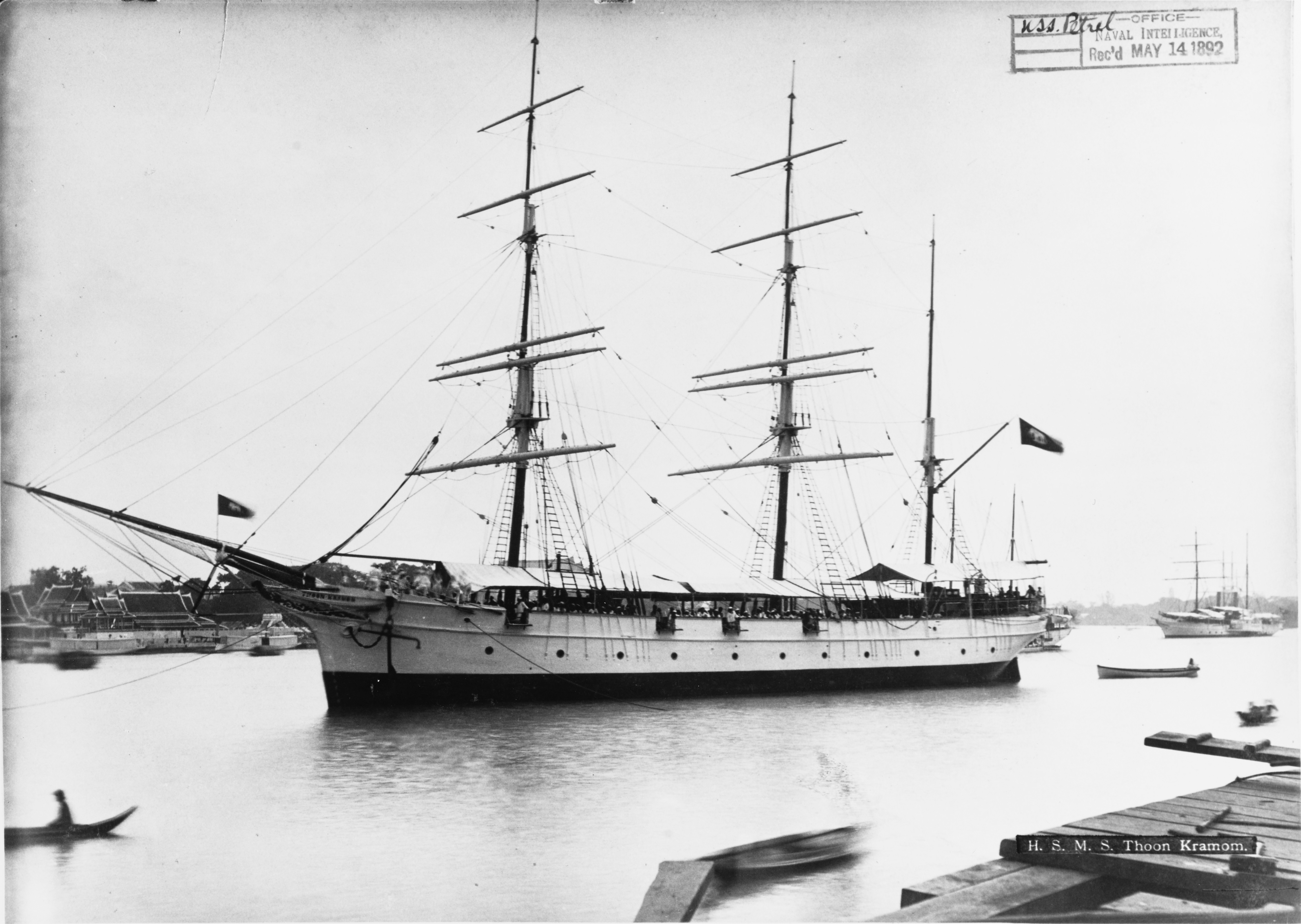
The Thoon Kramom in 1892

Thoon Kramom (Thai: ทูลกระหม่อม, RTGS: Thun Kramom, also spelled Kramoom, Kramon and Kramoon) was a wooden-hulled barque owned by the Siamese (Thai) royal government of King Chulalongkorn. It was built in 1866 in Bangkok, and was used as a trading vessel, counting among its captains the future Danish shipping magnate Hans Niels Andersen, who sailed it to England in 1883 with a cargo of teak. The ship was later converted for use by the Royal Siamese Navy as a training ship, and saw action in the 1893 Paknam Incident. The last sailing ship in the navy, it went out of service and was wrecked by the 1900s.

== Merchant career ==
The Thoon Kramom was built in Bangkok in 1866, under the orders, according to some Thai sources, of Prince Vongsadhiraj Sanid. The ship, registered in Bangkok, was a wooden-hulled barque with a net register tonnage of 475, and measured 151 feet in length, 28 in breadth, and 15 in depth (46 by 8.5 by 4.6 metres). Sources from its later naval career record a displacement of 800 tons.

By the 1870s, the Thoon Kramom was owned by the royal government of King Chulalongkorn, and was among some fifty vessels that comprised Siam's merchant fleet at the time. The management of the ship was handled by the Hanseatic trading company Pickenpack, Thies & Co., and it mostly made journeys to Singapore and Bombay. From 1876, the ship was captained by P. W. Vorrath (a German), who later passed the role to his Danish first mate Hans Niels Andersen.

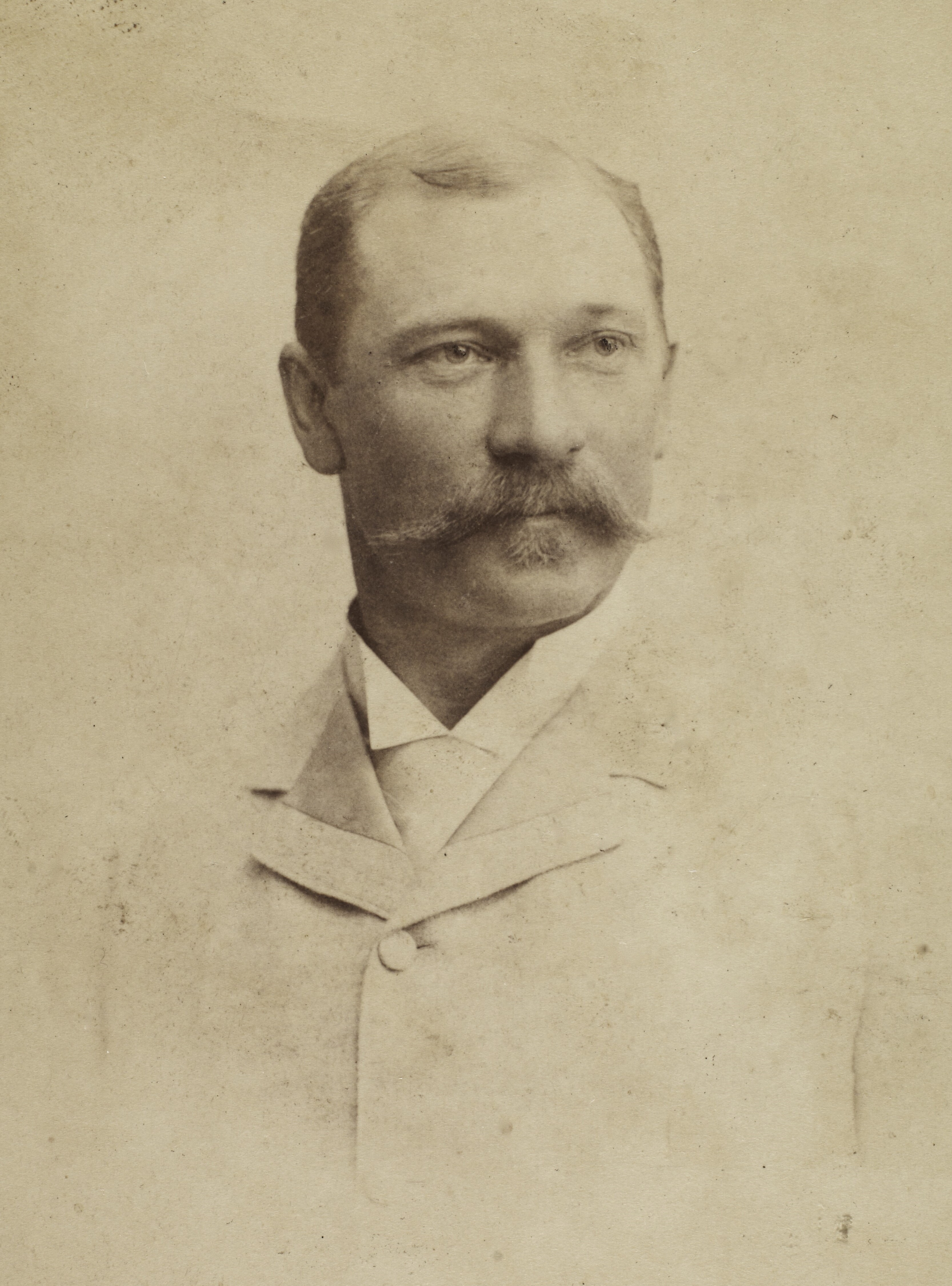
H. N. Andersen, captain of the Thoon Kramom in 1883, would later become Denmark's most successful shipping magnate of the early 20th century.

In 1883, Andersen took the ship on its most significant voyage, carrying a shipload of teak to England. Along the way, the crew witnessed the aftermath of the 1883 eruption of Krakatoa as the ship passed the Sunda Strait at the end of August. Thoon Kramom rounded the Cape of Good Hope and docked in Falmouth before continuing to Liverpool, where its cargo was sold for a profit of almost 100 percent. Andersen returned with a shipment of coal, which was sold to the Siamese navy after a journey totalling almost eleven months. The sale—the first direct export of Siamese teak to Europe—marked a pivotal moment in the development of the country's teak industry, after which many European companies began scrambling for a share in the rapidly developing trade.

Sometime after the journey, the ship was transferred to the Royal Siamese Navy. Andersen settled in Bangkok and would go on to found the East Asiatic Company, the shipping line that would become one of Denmark's largest corporations during the first half of the 20th century.

== Naval career ==
Under the navy, Thoon Kramom was mainly used as a training ship, although it was fitted with an armament of either six or eight muzzle-loading guns, (Note: Sources differ in their accounting of the guns. One says they were four 4-inch 32-pounder muzzle loaders and four smaller guns. Another lists them as 16-, 18- and 20-pounders, eight in total. The Petrel report (see further down) says six brass howitzers, while Warington Smyth (also further down) described its armament as "six brass carronades for saluting purposes".) and was referred to as a cruiser by some sources.

An intelligence report filed by the USS Petrel, visiting Bangkok in 1892, described the Thoon Kramom as follows:

The training ship, Thoon Kramon [sic], formerly a merchantman, is a barque of about 1000 tons, mounting six muzzle loading brass howitzers in broadside. Her headquarters are at Ko Chang, (Note: Actually Ko Sichang.) an island twenty miles down the coast from the mouth of the Menam River. She is constantly in commission cruising about the gulf.

According to the report, Thoon Kramom was the only ship in the fleet that was regularly at sea (in the Gulf of Thailand). Records also note that it sometimes sailed to Singapore. At that time, Danish mariner Andreas du Plessis de Richelieu had recently become head of the Siamese navy, and the ships were largely crewed by European (increasingly Danish) officers and native sailors. In his 1898 memoir, H. Warington Smyth wrote of the Thoon Kramom,

The training barque which takes the youngsters away in the gulf some months every year is the most refreshing sight in the country, and the cleanest, smartest, and most efficient thing the Government can boast of. It shows what can be done with Siamese properly trained.

Thoon Kramom was one of the Thai naval vessels that engaged with the two French warships forcing their way up the Chao Phraya in the 1893 Pak Nam Incident. It was damaged in the battle, in which two of its crew were killed.

The last sailing ship in the navy, Thoon Kramom was removed from service some years later. (Note: Some sources state that it was sold to the East Asiatic Company, but this is not corroborated by EAC records. The date is given as 1903 or 1923, the latter of which is clearly erroneous, probably confusing it with a later ship of the same name.) It became wrecked in the Chao Phraya in Bangkok prior to 1908, when the reference book Twentieth Century Impressions of Siam noted that its shell "may now be seen rotting at low water outside the palace of the late Prince Mahisra".

== Replica ==
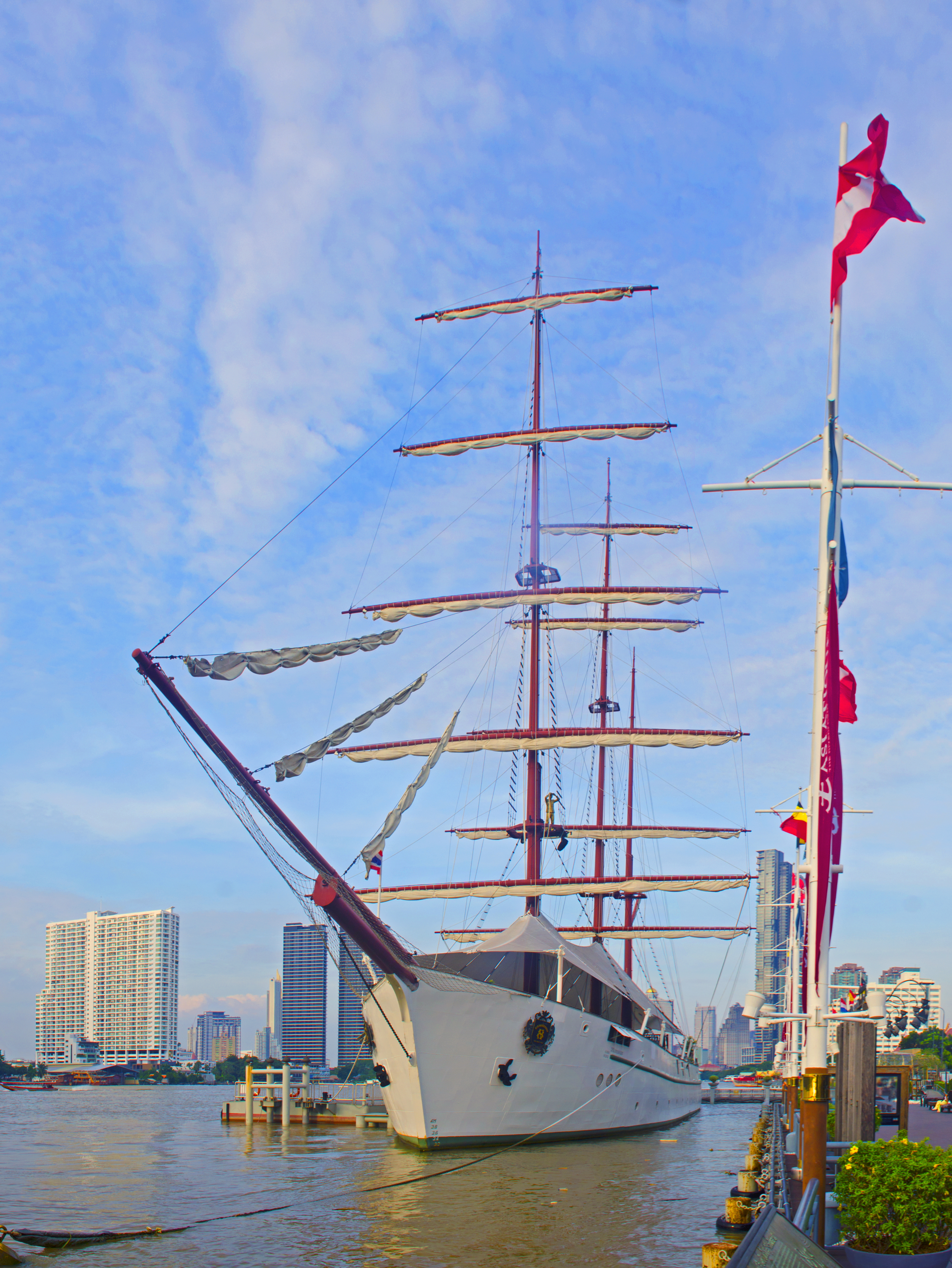
Replica ship Sirimahannop

In the 2010s, a replica ship, the Sirimahannop, was commissioned by the owners of Asiatique, a themed shopping mall that now occupies the East Asiatic Company's former dockyards. Built by the Bangkok Dock Company, the ship was floated out in 2020, and is permanently moored at Asiatique, serving as a floating restaurant and bar.
