= Følle =

- Suburb of Rønde
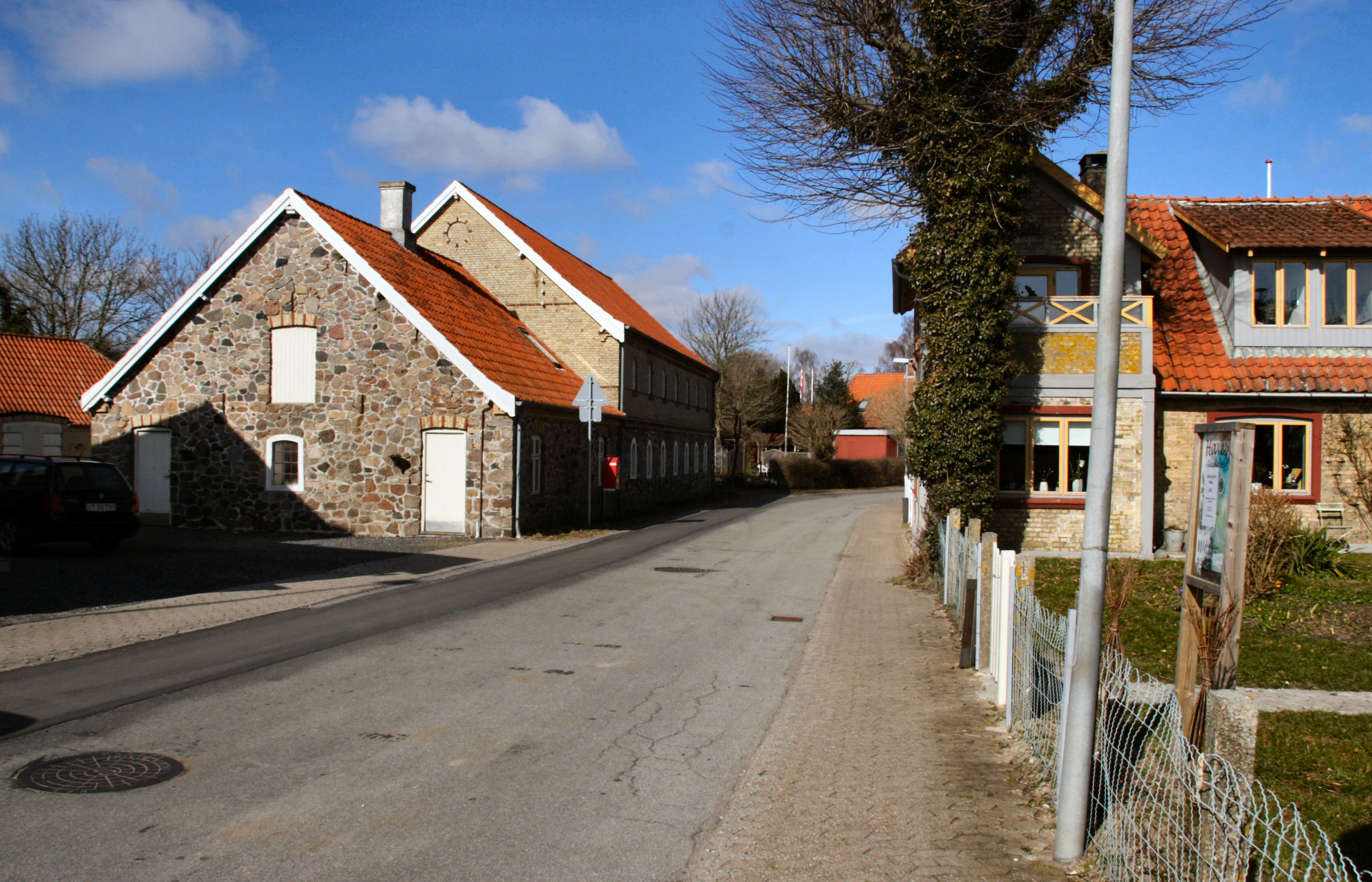

- Location within Denmark
- Coordinates: 56°18′31″N 10°26′41″E
- Country: Denmark
- Region: Central Denmark (Midtjylland)
- Municipality: Syddjurs

Population (2012)
  - Total: 257
- Time zone: UTC+1 (Central European Time)
  - Summer (DST): UTC+2 (Central European Summer Time)

Følle is a suburb of Rønde in Syddjurs Municipality, Denmark.
