= MS Vulcanus (1910) =

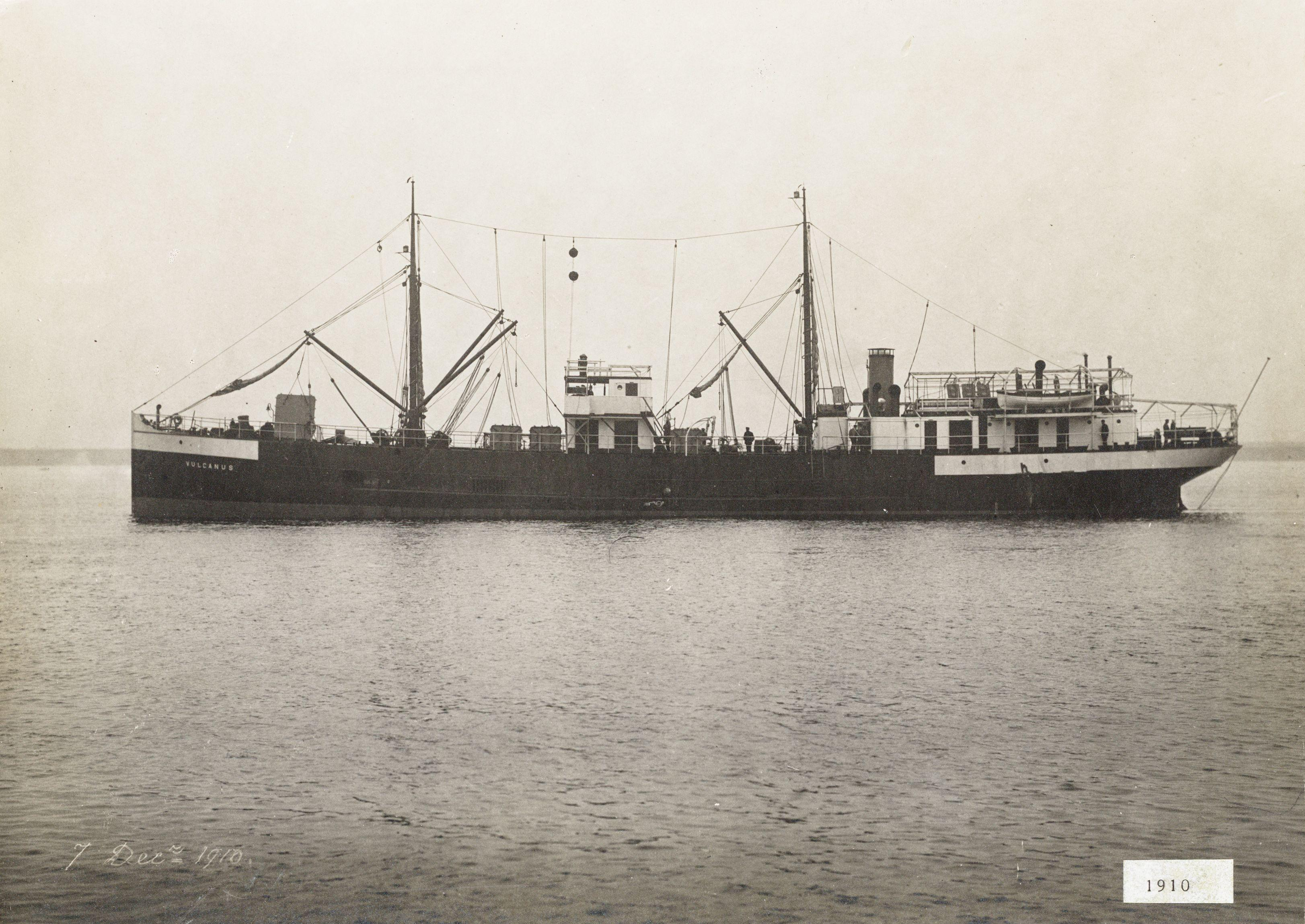

History
- Name: Vulcanus
- Operator: Nederlandsch-Indische Tank Stoomboot Maatschappij
- Builder: Nederlandsche Scheepsbouw Maatschappij
- Yard number: 106
- Laid down: July 15, 1910
- Launched: October 29, 1910
- Acquired: December 20, 1910
- Out of service: October 1931
- Identification: TJHQ
- Fate: Scrapped

General characteristics
- Tonnage: 1,179 GRT
- Length: 195 ft 8 in (59.65 m)
- Speed: 8 knots (15 km/h; 9 mph)

MS Vulcanus was a motor-powered tanker constructed by the Nederlandsche Scheepsbouw Maatschappij, which was the first Dutch motor ship. Because of the hazardous liquids the ship would carry, a motor engine was chosen due to concerns about sparks from a steam engine posing a fire risk.

Comparing tankers that were fitted with a steam engine against the Vulcanus, it showed that the Vulcanus only consumed an estimate of 2 tons of oil, while other tankers consumed around 11 tons of coal.

== History ==
Sometime in 1911, the Vulcanus became beached during low tide at the Goodwin Sands. A portion of the gasoline cargo was pumped out of the ship, which then allowed the ship to be refloated.
