= Burmeister & Wain =

Former Danish industrial company

- Industry: Manufacturing, marine engineering
- Predecessor: Baumgarten & Burmeister (B&B)
- Founded: 1865
- Founder: Hans Heinrich Baumgarten, Carl Christian Burmeister, William Wain
- Defunct: 1980
- Fate: Acquired
- Successor: MAN B&W Diesel
- Headquarters: Copenhagen, Denmark
- Products: Diesel engines
- Owner: Volkswagen Group
- Parent: MAN SE

Burmeister & Wain was a large established Danish shipyard and leading diesel engine producer headquartered in Copenhagen, Denmark. Founded by two Danes and an Englishman, its earliest roots stretch back to 1846. Over its 150-year history, it grew successfully into a strong company through the end of the 1960s. In the 1970s, global competitive pressures, particularly from the far east, began to take their toll. In 1980, B&W became MAN B&W Diesel A/S, part of MAN B&W Diesel Group, a subsidiary of the German corporation MAN AG, with operations worldwide. The company still maintains operations at three main sites in Denmark for manufacturing, servicing, and licensing of its two-stroke engines and complete propulsion systems.

== History ==
=== Origins ===
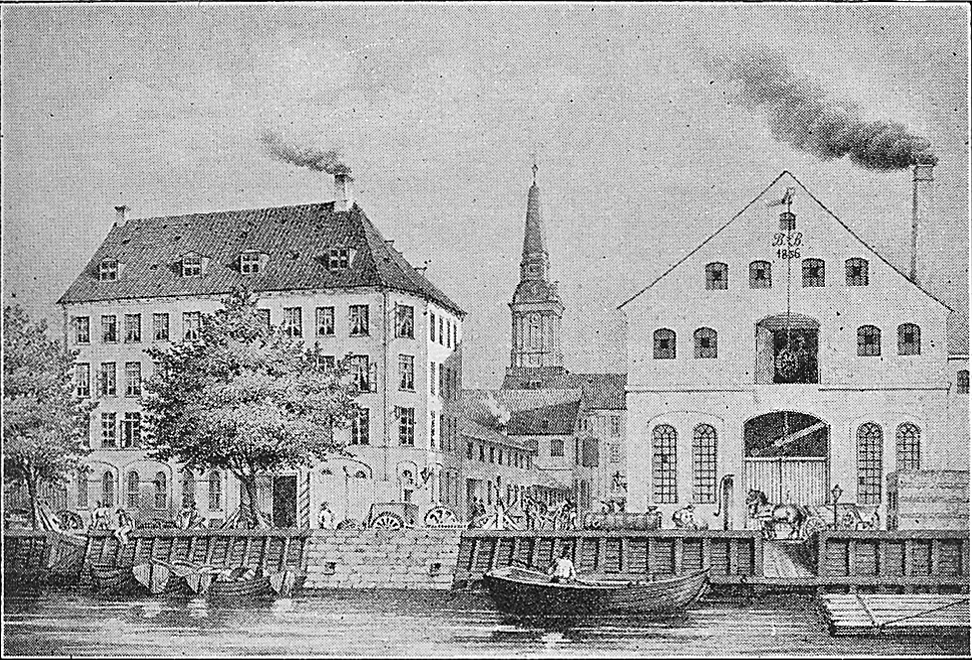
Baumgarten & Burmeister foundry at Christianshavn about 1850

Hans Heinrich Baumgarten (1806–1875) was from the town of Halstenbek near Pinneberg, in the Duchy of Holstein, an area of Germany that was then under the rule of the king of Denmark. He was apprenticed as a coffin maker by a farmer whose livestock he cared for. Later he was a carpenter before becoming a machine minder at the Danish newspaper Berlingske Tidende, whose printing office he later worked for in Berlin. After trying to start a business with different partners, while in Berlin he was allowed an audience, on the subject of establishing a business in Copenhagen, with Crown Prince Christian of Denmark who was visiting. Shortly thereafter, in 1843 he was granted a Danish Royal Charter and what would later become Burmeister & Wain was launched with the opening of a mechanical workshop in Copenhagen.

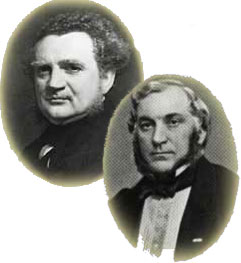
Carl Christian Burmeister and William Wain

=== Earliest years ===
Carl Christian Burmeister (1821–1898) was born into poverty. The son of a cook and restaurant keeper, he studied at the Polytechnical Institute in Copenhagen from 1836 to 1846, now the Technical University of Denmark. He had been awarded a scholarship abroad after recommendation following an assistantship to Hans Christian Ørsted (1777–1851) who was director there at the time. Burmeister joined the H.H. Baumgarten Company in 1846, which became a partnership with the opening of its engineering works, and was renamed B&B.

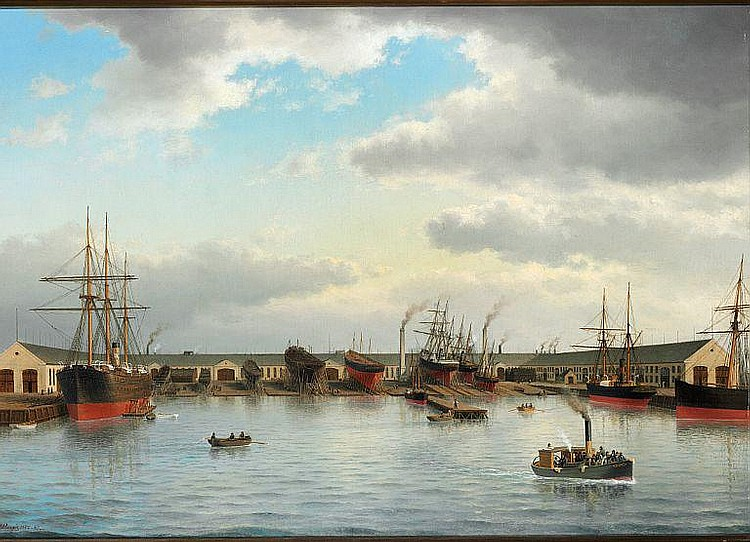
The B&W shipyard painted by Carl Baagøe

Soon came the establishment of the B&B foundry in 1847, the delivery of its first steam engine in 1848, the renting of the Jacob Holm Shipyard at the 'Englishman's Place' in 1851, and the delivery of their first ship S/S Hermod in 1854, before Baumgarten retired from regular duties in 1861. With Baumgarten as a co-owner, in 1865, William Wain (1819–1882) joined what then became B&W. In 1872 the company became A/S B&W (Aktieselskabet Burmeister & Wain), a limited liability corporation. That same year saw the founding of the Refshale Island shipyard. At this point, Baumgarten, as the first founder, became a director of the board of what he would see become Burmeister & Wain Maskin- og Skibsbyggeri (Engineering and Shipbuilding) in 1880. Wain, from Bolton, England had apprenticed as an engineer in his youth and come up through the trades. He had worked for the Royal Danish Navy and the Royal Dutch dockyards. He came to have several designs to his credit within the company and his ingenuity was seen as "instrumental" in establishing its reputation. In 1881 B&W bought the patent for a milk separator from Peterson Brothers and by 1905 produced a range of dairy equipment, employing about 3,000 staff in their 'Perfect' works in Copenhagen.

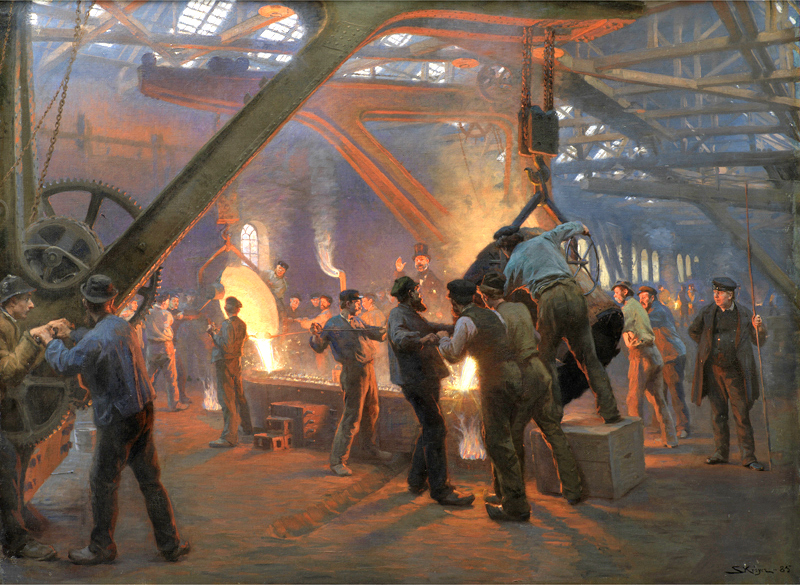
Burmeister & Wain in 1885

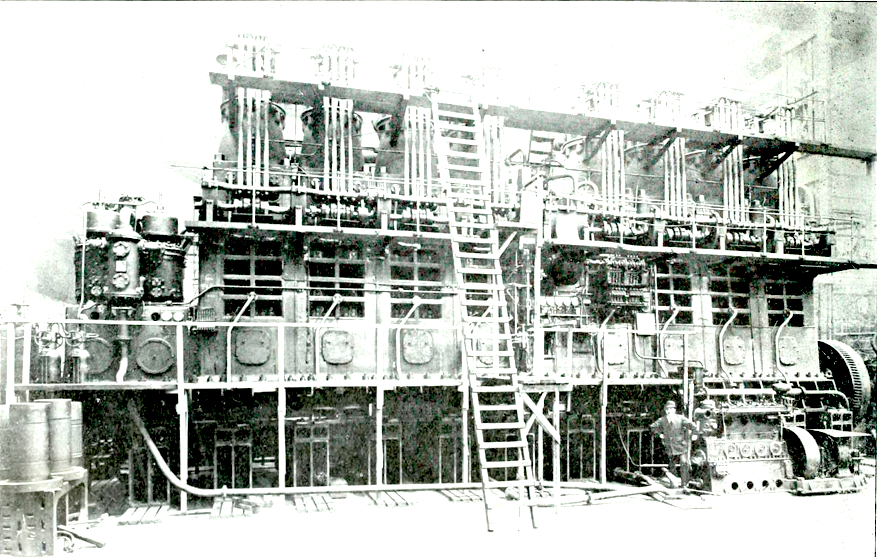
One of the eight-cylinder 3200 I.H.P. Harland and Wolff—Burmeister & Wain Diesel engines installed in the motorship Glenapp. This was the highest powered Diesel engine yet installed in a ship. (1920)

=== Growth and development ===
Production of stationary paraffin engines began in 1890. Then, in 1898, a year after introducing it to the world, B&W director Ivar Knudsen (1861–1920) negotiated with Rudolf Diesel exclusive Danish manufacturing rights for the diesel engine. A test engine was built that same year. The 1903-1904 year saw delivery of their first diesel engine to the N. Larsen Carriage Factory. 1911-1912 saw the world's first ever ocean-going diesel-powered ship, M/S Selandia, start her maiden voyage from Copenhagen to Bangkok with two B&W four-stroke main engines (furnishing a total of 2,500 hp).

The larger Teglholmen iron foundry was established in the 1920-1921 year to provide capacity for growth in the coming years of business acquisition.

William Elmgreen worked at Burmeister & Wain in Copenhagen as a 20 year old apprentice in 1922. His father Jens Peter Elmgreen had worked there in the 1890s. He later recalled that at that time some 12,000 workers were engaged to build ships, manufacture diesel engines and carry out ship repairs of all kinds. He was one of 2,500 men on Refshale Island, building and repairing ships. They had private lockers for their gear, their bikes were sheltered in enormous sheds, and they had access to modern shower rooms – all regarded as modern conveniences in 1922. In the canteen - seating 2,500 - a hot lunch cost 0.75 Kr, and beer was also available in unlimited quantities. On one hot summer's day, seventy cases @ 50 bottles per case of beer were consumed in the canteen by the workers in their lunch hour and a half. Well-cooked food was picked up at the food bar, run by the Workers’ Cooperative, milk and soft drinks were also available. Tools were available at the tool sheds, workers signed for them and paid if they lost any. Each worker was allocated a number (his was 2274). He was engaged on a piece work basis, and worked in a propeller gang.

The first B&W two-stroke diesel engine set off to sea in 1930 and the world's largest diesel engine at the time was delivered in 1933 to H. C. Ørsted Power Station. Steady progress and consolidation continued through the period of World War II and the subsequent period of reinvigorated prosperity. The first turbocharged two-stroke diesel engine was commissioned in 1952 with larger and more innovative designs to follow.

By this point, the company's engines and licensed designs were used worldwide throughout the industry. Meanwhile, post-war east Asian economies began to emerge as an industrial force.

=== Recent adjustment and recovery ===
In 1971, the shipyard and the engineering works were split into two independent companies. A more challenging period ensued until the 1979-1980 year when B&W Diesel A/S was established, and its shares were sold to MAN, of Germany. Though engine production at Christianshavn was later discontinued in 1987, successful engine programs were rolled out. At Teglholmen in 1988 a spare parts and key components production factory was established as was an R&D Centre at the same site in 1992. Though all Copenhagen operations were consolidated at Teglholmen in 1994 and the last volume production unit at the B&W Shipyard was delivered in 1996. In 2000 MAN B&W Diesel two-stroke diesel engines had over 70% market share, with a substantial number of MC-line engines on order.

The electronically controlled line of ME diesel two-stroke engines was added in 2002 with a maximum cylinder bore of 108 cm. MAN B&W Diesel, Denmark, employed approximately 2,200 at the end of 2003 and had 100 million kW, or more than 8000 MC engines, in service or on order by 2004.

== See also ==
- Hans Henrik Baumgarten

== Other sources ==
- Fred M. Walker (2010) Ships and Shipbuilders: Pioneers of Design and Construction (Seaforth Publishing) ISBN 9781783830404

== Related reading ==
- Erik Eriksen (1993) Værftet bag de 1000 skibe: Burmeister & Wain Skibsværft 1843-1993 (Fr.G. Knudtzons Bogtrykkeri) ISBN 87-88949-28-1
- Ole Lange (2001) Juvelen der blev til skrot: kampen om B&W 1945-1996 (Gyldendal) ISBN 87-02-00482-8
- Niels Jul Nielsen (2002) Virksomhed og arbejderliv: bånd, brudflader og bevidsthed på B&W 1850-1920 (Museum Tusculanums Forlag) ISBN 87-7289-681-7
- Niels Bjørn Hansen (2008) B&W - værftet der ikke måtte overleve (Sohn) ISBN 978-87-91959-35-6
