= Ercole Manfredi =

Italian architect

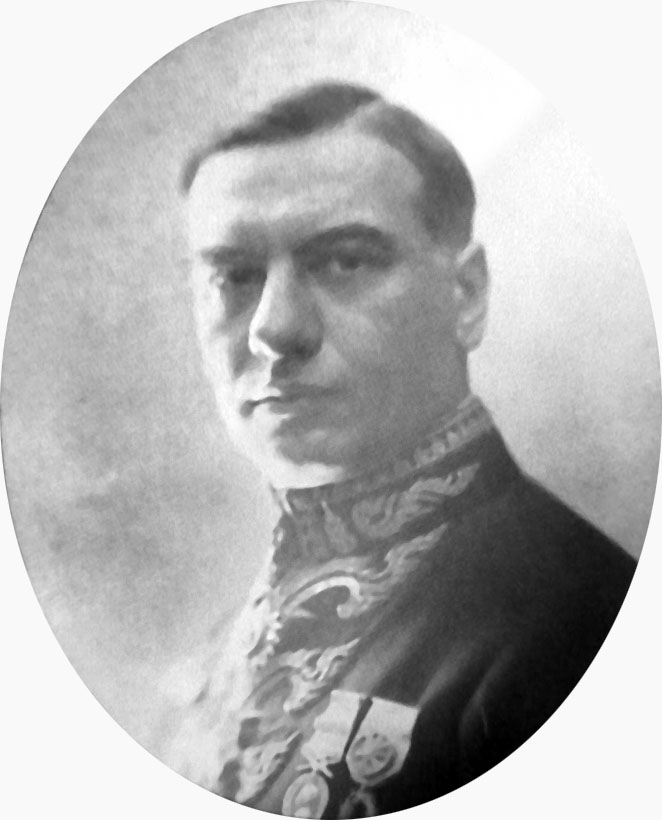
- Manfredi as Lieutenant-Commander on the Royal Naval Scout Corps—Private Battalion of His Majesty, in the capacity of Naval Architect
- Born: 2 July 1883; Turin, Italy
- Died: 9 June 1973 (aged 89); Bangkok, Thailand
- Citizenship: Italian / Thai
- Education: Accademia Albertina
- Occupation: Architect
- Practice: Government of Siam; Christiani & Nielsen (Siam) Ltd. The Impresitor Company
- Buildings: Ananta Samakhom Throne Hall (1908–15; collaboration); Mrigadayavan Palace (1923–24); Villa Norasingh (1923–25, collaboration)

Ercole Pietro Manfredi (2 July 1883 – 9 June 1973) was an Italian architect who lived and worked in early twentieth-century Siam (now Thailand). Born in Turin, Italy, he attended the Albertina Academy of Fine Arts before travelling to Bangkok, where he was one of many Westerners employed by the Siamese government.

He made significant career progress through the court of King Vajiravudh, but left government office to work privately as the country was going through political change, which abolished absolute monarchy and decreased government employment of foreigners. However, by adopting a Thai identity and way of life, marrying a Thai woman and settling down permanently, Manfredi remained a relevant and respected figure in Thai architecture, and later became a lecturer at Chulalongkorn University. His works include various royal residences and public institutions, ranging in style from Venetian Gothic to modernist, and incorporated Thai traditional styles as well. He contributed to much of Bangkok's architectural heritage, but no complete records of his works were kept.

== Early life ==
Ercole Pietro Manfredi was born on 2 July 1883 in Turin, Italy to Luigi Manfredi and Caterina Bo. He attended the Lagrange Royal Technical School starting in 1894 and the San Carlo Technical School from 1898 to 1899. At the age of sixteen, he was admitted into the Albertina Academy of Fine Arts, where, during his studies, he received a first prize in architecture, design, perspective and painting. He received a diploma in 1907 and subsequently attended the Higher Course in Architecture. During this time, he also worked for Turin's Public and Municipal Works Department, where he supervised constructions and patented an earthquake engineering system. In 1909, he graduated with a High Qualification as painter and architect, receiving a gold medal first prize in addition to fifteen other prizes won during his studies.

== Career ==
In 1909, Manfredi was selected by the academy to fill an architect position for the government of Siam (now Thailand). Sailing from Genoa, he arrived in Bangkok on 1 December. He was placed under the Architectural Section of the Ministry of Public Works, working under engineer-in-chief Carlo Allegri and Minister Prince Nares Varariddhi. He collaborated with many Italian architects employed by the government, including Mario Tamagno, who was the department's chief architect, and others who were involved in the construction of Ananta Samakhom Throne Hall. Many of these architects were in fact also from Turin or alumni of Albertina.

In 1912, Manfredi was promoted to a position in the Ministry of the Royal Household, where he worked closely with King Vajiravudh and Prince Narisara Nuvadtivongs. He was subsequently promoted to Chief Architect and third court officer in 1917 and first court officer in 1921. In 1920, he was appointed the post of naval architect, with the rank of lieutenant-commander in the Royal Naval Scout Corps, which was the king's private battalion in the Wild Tiger Corps paramilitary movement. He later became Chief Architect of the Archaeological Section of the Royal Institute in 1926. During his service to the government, he was decorated with the Order of the Crown of Siam (commander, 1913), the Dushdi Mala Medal for artistic merit (1915), and the Order of the White Elephant (commander, 1920). He was also awarded the gold medal prize at the Bangkok Fine Arts Exhibition in 1917.

In 1930, during the period of political turmoil leading up to the abolition of absolute monarchy in the Siamese Revolution of 1932, Manfredi retired from government office. For a while, he pursued archaeological studies as an assistant to the French archaeologist George Coedes. He then continued his work as an architect, privately cooperating with Christiani & Nielsen (Siam) Ltd. from 1934 to 1936 and the Impresitor Company from 1937 to 1938.

In 1939, Manfredi became a lecturer at the Faculty of Architecture of Chulalongkorn University, where he taught for eight years. He also served as a lecturer in the Signalling Division of the Royal Thai Navy from 1944 to 1950 before retiring from public life.

== Personal life ==
While in Turin, Manfredi married his first wife, by whom he had two children—Luisa (1906–1990) and Gabriele (1914–2016)—both of whom would later become active in the partisan resistance against Mussolini during 1943–1945. Luisa would marry writer Robin Victor Lethbridge Raleigh-King in 1950.

In Siam, Manfredi adopted the local culture and way of life. He dressed and ate like a Thai, mingled with Thai friends, and used an abacus to calculate. His government contract had required him "to be able within one year to converse in Siamese in a tolerable way," but he went further and became fluent in both the spoken and written language.

Manfredi married a Thai wife, Thongmuan (Thai: ทองม้วน), with Buddhist rites in 1913, while his pregnant first wife returned to Italy. He and Thongmuan had two daughters and lived together in what he described as "years of paradise". He left the country only twice, in 1925 and 1928, to represent Siam at the second and third International Book Fairs in Florence.

Following the revolution of 1932, rising nationalistic sentiments resulted in a large decline in the role and numbers of Westerners working for the government. Manfredi was among the few who remained in Thailand. Like Corrado Feroci, he took up a Thai name, Ekkarit Manfendi (เอกฤทธิ์ หมั่นเฟ้นดี), and received Thai nationality on 29 November 1943. By adopting a Thai identity, he remained a relevant and respected figure in the Thai field of architecture.

Manfredi was involved in various humanitarian and cultural organisations. He was a member of the Siam and the Italian Red Cross, the Siam Teachers' Association, the Automobile Club of Siam, and the Alliance française. He also maintained links with his Italian roots, and was a member of the Dante Alighieri Society, the Colonial Italian Institute, and the Italian Touring Club. He was also selected as a correspondent member of the Italian Book Institute of Florence in 1929.

Manfredi has been described as rather eccentric for a foreigner in Siam at the time. In an interview, his daughter Maly Manfredi remarked that he was "an odd number". He was also noted to be impulsive and stubborn, often ignoring his wife's sensible advice to do what he wanted, including leaving his official post to pursue archaeology. According to Maly, "as court architect, he used to fly into a rage at the suppliers' gifts," and "Papa needed a big organisation to discipline him, like the Court or Chulalongkorn University." At the age of seventy-five, Manfredi realised his dream project of building a boat; to finance, he had to sell his entire collection of Siamese art. He named the boat Mammino, and used it mostly for pleasure cruises to Pattaya.

Manfredi lived in Thailand until his death on 9 June 1973. He and his wife (who died six years later) were interred at the Christian cemetery at Ban Pong, Ratchaburi.

== Works ==
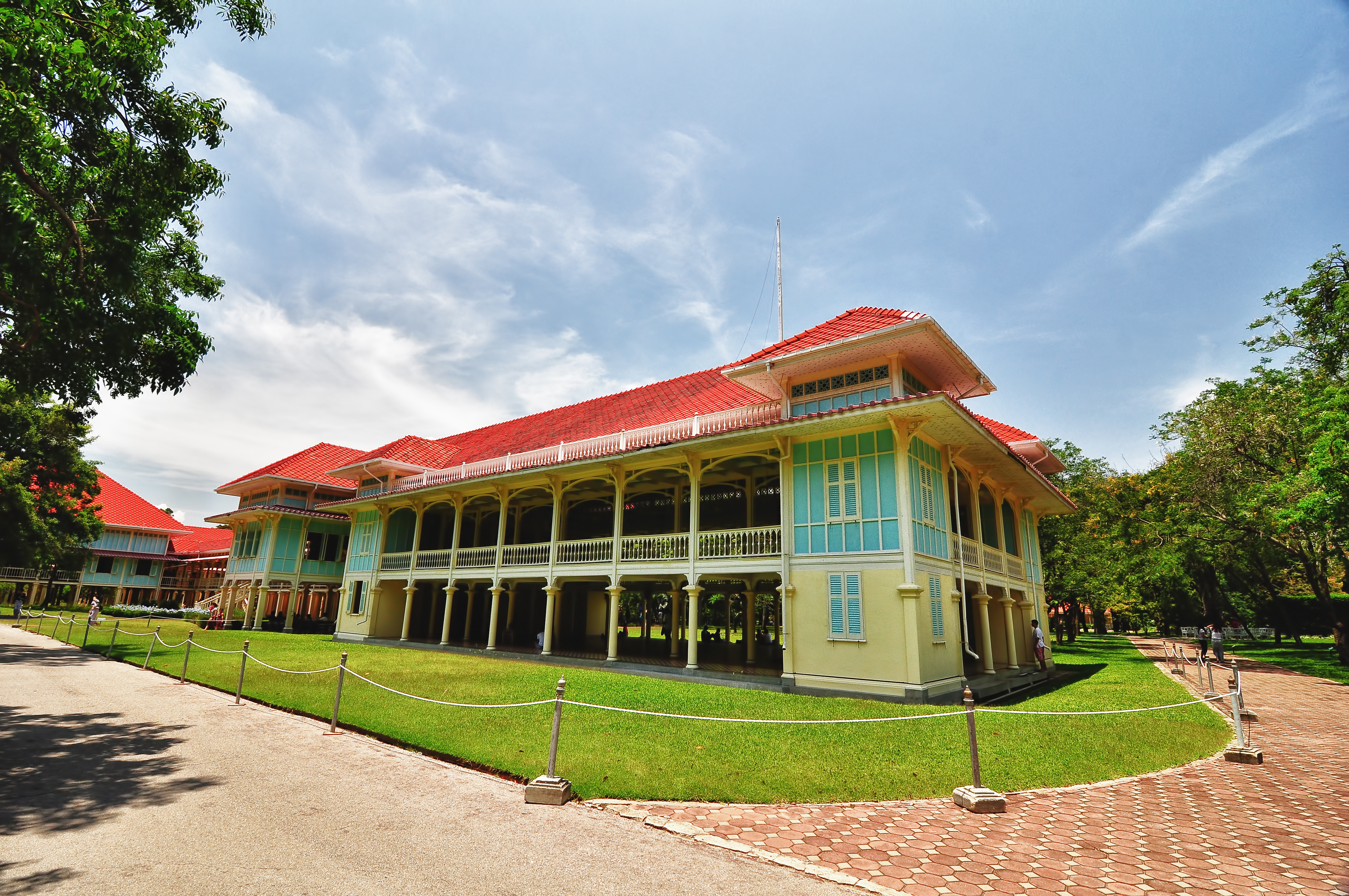
Mrigadayavan Palace

Manfredi contributed to much of Bangkok's architecture and also produced works of painting and sculpture. However, he did not keep a record of his contributions, and his employment by the government means that many of his designs were not attributed. He also produced architectural works during his time in Turin, but his work during the brief period make up only a minority of his accomplishments.

=== Architecture ===
Manfredi's architectural works involve both Thai and Western designs, which he adapted and developed to suit the local tradition. The more notable of these consist of royal palaces and villas; he also designed buildings for various public institutions.

Upon his arrival in Bangkok in 1909, Manfredi collaborated with other Italian architects in the construction of Ananta Samakhom Throne Hall, which had begun in 1908 and lasted until 1915. Manfredi was mainly responsible for the dome and the roof of the building, which was designed in the Italian Renaissance and neoclassical styles and modelled in part after the Basilica of Superga. "Much of that copper covering the Hall, I put on with my own hands," he said in an interview with the Bangkok Post in 1967. He also contributed to the decorations and was responsible for later work on the building's foundations.

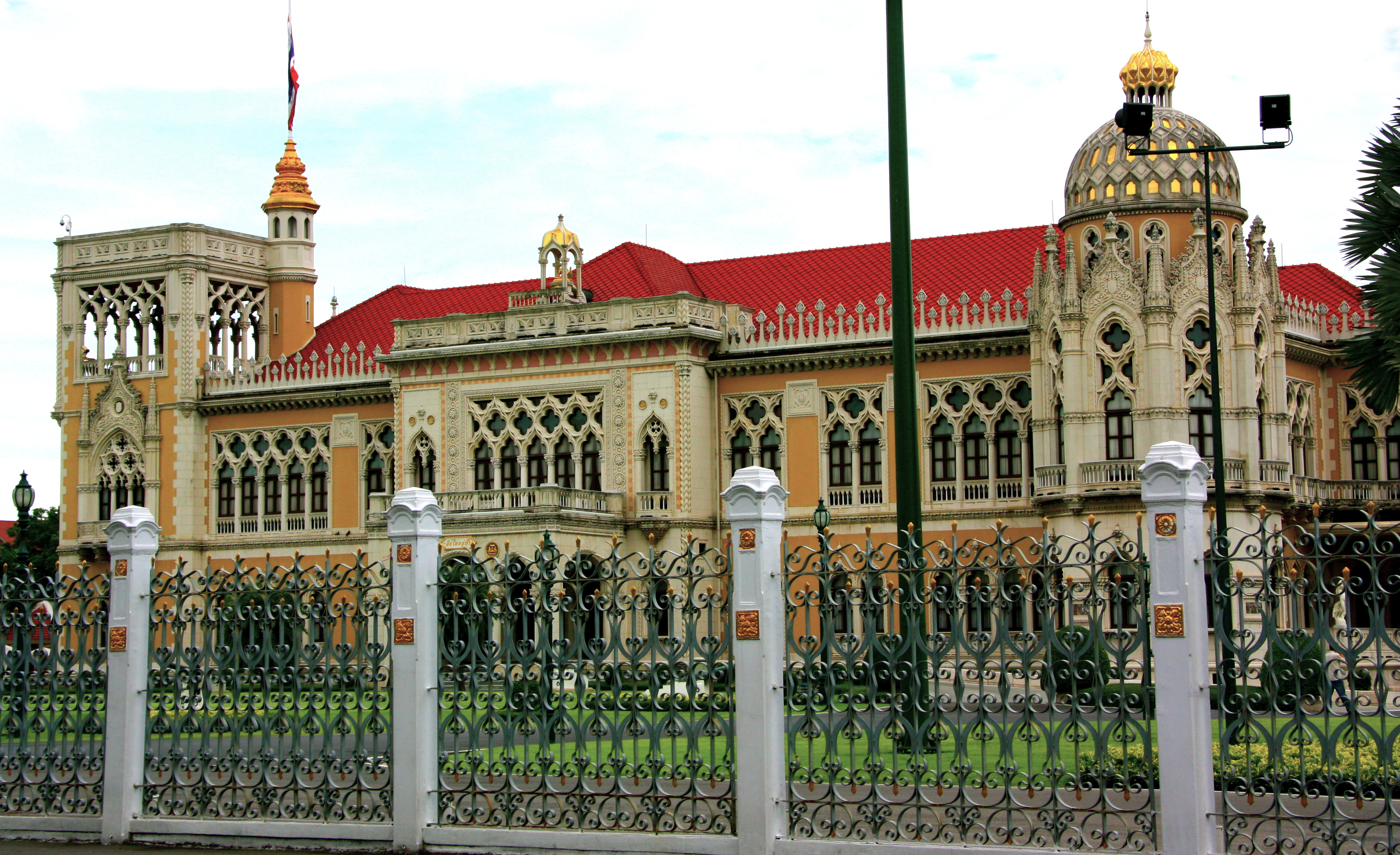
Thai Khu Fa Building of the Government House, formerly Villa Norasingh

He acted as chief architect for Mrigadayavan Palace in Cha-am and was in charge of its construction, which took place from 1923 to 1924. Designs for the seaside villa were sketched by King Vajiravudh and implemented by Manfredi. The palace consists of sixteen buildings and incorporates the Thai manner of elevated buildings with Western style and details. He also contributed to the design and construction of Villa Norasingh (1923–25), now the Thai Khu Fa Building of the Government House, although it is not officially attributed to him. The building was constructed mainly in the Venetian Gothic style and has a façade resembling that of Venice's Ca' d'Oro. He was not satisfied with the results, saying in a 1967 interview, "I built it in the Venetian style because I thought that Bangkok was the Venice of the East. Now I am so ashamed of it. It is not just right for this climate."

Manfredi produced many modernist designs in the 1930s. These include Manfredi Residence (1935) and Asawin Villa (c.1930s), which were influenced by the Bauhaus school and are among the first modernist buildings in Thailand. The decade saw widespread adoption of the International style for public and educational institutions. Among these are Manfredi's designs for the Rajvithi School of Nursing (c.1930s) and the Chulalongkorn University Faculty of Dentistry (1939). Influences by the neoplastic (De Stijl) movement are seen in his designs for Triam Udom Suksa School (1934). He also designed Chulalongkorn University's Faculty of Fine Arts building, as well as the Chemistry and Physics buildings of the Faculty of Science.

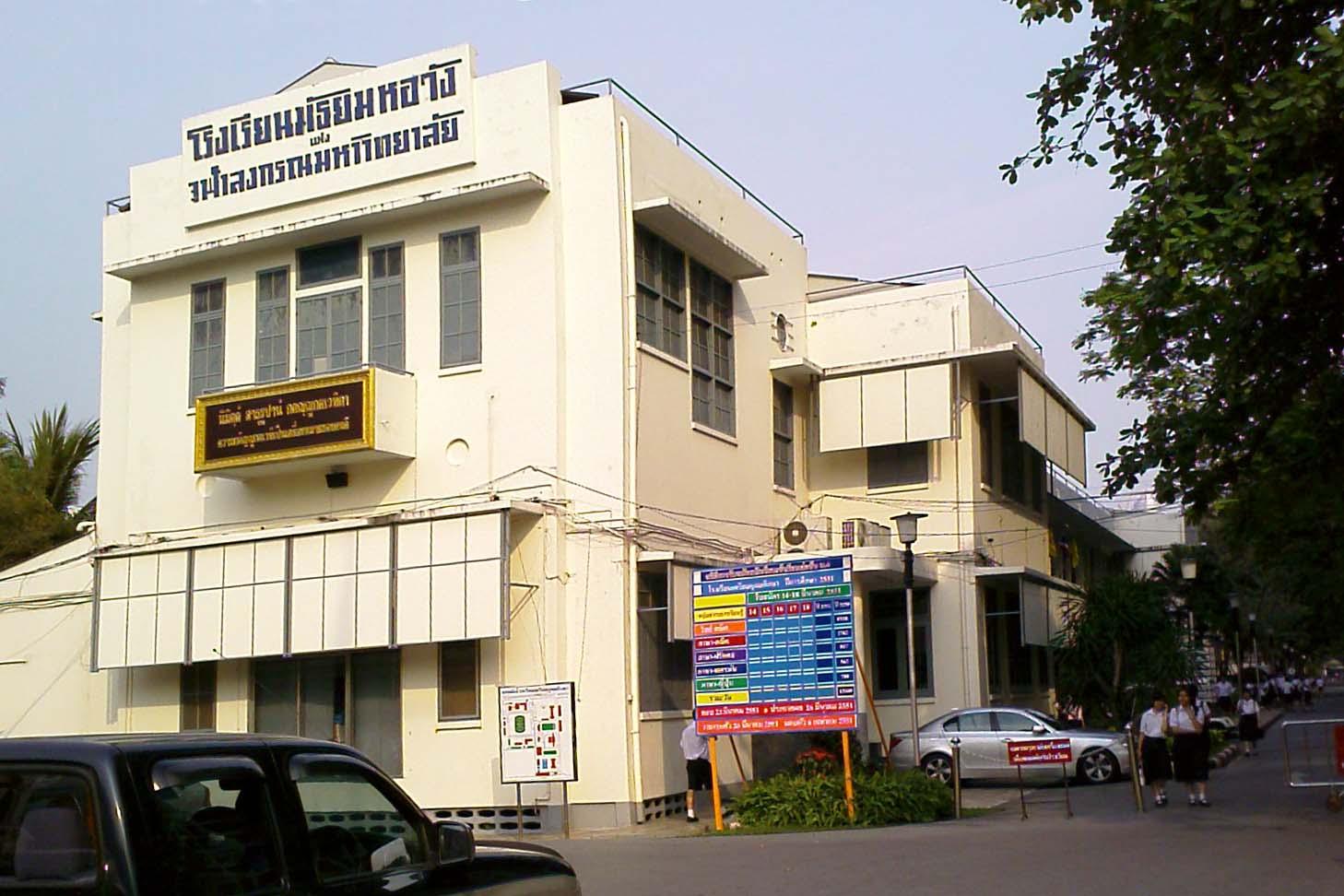
Building 1, Triam Udom Suksa School

Other contributions by Manfredi include:

- Chakrabongse House (1909–1910), the residence of Prince Chakrabongse Bhuvanath on Maha Rat Road (with later contributions by Edward Healey)
- Maliwan Mansion (1917), the residence of Prince Nares Varariddhi, currently the FAO's regional office
- Pibultham Villa (c.1920) the residence of M.R. Pum Malakul, the Minister of the Royal Household
- Sa Pathum Palace
- The main building of Silpakorn University
- Renovation of the Borom Phiman Hall and modification of the ceiling of Dusit Mahaprasad Hall in the Grand Palace
- The bridge and gate houses at the official entrance of Chitralada Palace
- The residence of the director of the Bank of Indochina on Sathon Road
- Restoration of the Bang Pa-in Palace
- The first swimming pool in Thailand at the Royal Bangkok Sports Club.

=== Sculpture ===
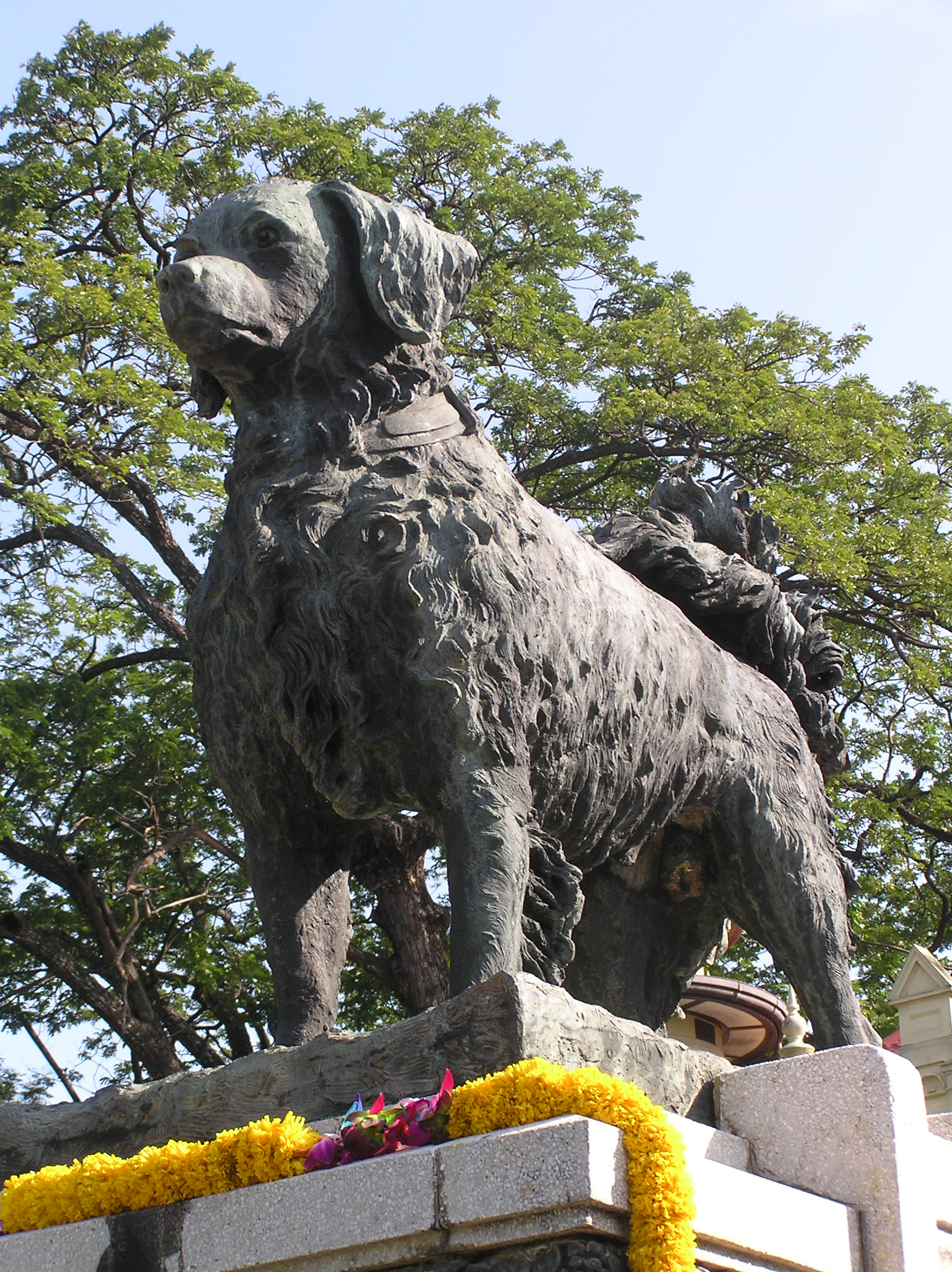
Statue of Jarlet at Sanam Chandra Palace

Manfredi did not specialise in sculpture, but two such works by him are known. They are the marble guardian lions at Wat Benchamabophit and the statue of Jarlet, King Vajiravudh's beloved dog, at Sanam Chandra Palace.

=== Painting ===
Having focused on painting early in his studies, Manfredi produced many visual works but was not well known for them. Most of his paintings have been dispersed; he sometimes gave them freely to friends and sold most of his possessions late in life. His known painted works include the following:

- Contributions to the interior decoration of the Ananta Samakhom Throne Hall; Most of the work was done by Galileo Chini.
- Interior wall and ceiling designs (1912), which were presented to King Vajiravudh
- Interior of the Borom Phiman Hall (1917), in cooperation with Prince Narisara Nuvadtivongs and Carlo Rigoli
- Portraits on ivory of King Vajiravudh and the Queen, part of a collection of miniature portraits on ivory
- Watercolour of the Ananta Samakhom Throne Hall (8 January 1920); This was probably a present to King Vajiravudh, and is currently displayed in the Sukhothai Palace.

=== Other works ===
Manfredi designed scenes and costumes to be used in King Vajiravudh's theatrical plays, most notably that of the king's Thai adaptation of The Merchant of Venice. He did not limit his contributions to the arts, but also worked on engineering projects. He improved on the mechanics involved in the royal funeral procession and was particularly interested in developing an irrigation system for the country.

== Bibliography ==
- Bressan, Luigi (1997), "Ercole Manfredi: One of the great architects of Bangkok (1883–1973)", Italian-Thai studies from the nineteenth century to present, Bangkok: Silpakorn University.
- De Lazara, Leopoldo Ferri; Piazza, Paolo; Cassio, Alberto (1992), Italiani alla corte del siam–Italians at the court of Siam–ชาวอิตาเลียนในราชสำนักไทย, Bangkok: Amarin Printing and Publishing (published 1996), ISBN 978-974-8364-60-5.
- Noobanjong, Koompong (2003), Power, Identity, and the Rise of Modern Architecture: From Siam to Thailand, USA: Universal Publishers, ISBN 978-1-58112-201-5.
