= Government House (Thailand) =

Official workplace of the prime minister of Thailand

- ทำเนียบรัฐบาล

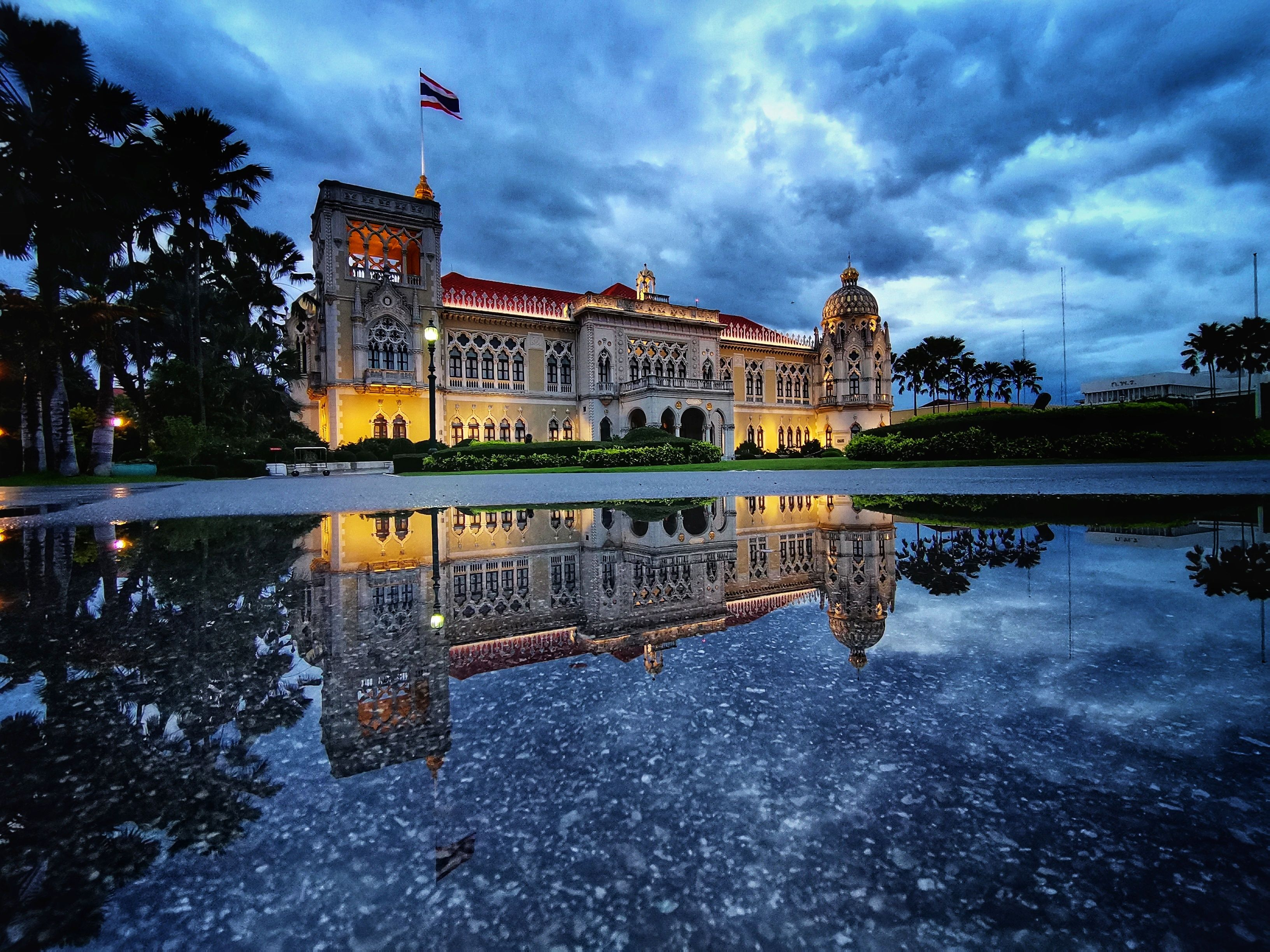
- Government House of Thailand in 2021

- Location within Thailand

General information
- Architectural style: Venetian Gothic
- Location: 1 Phitsanulok Road Dusit District 10300, Bangkok, Thailand
- Coordinates: 13°45′47″N 100°30′43″E
- Current tenants: Prime Minister of Thailand
- Construction started: January 1, 1925; 101 years ago
- Owner: Government of Thailand

Technical details
- Grounds: 45,000 m^{2} (11 acres)

Design and construction
- Architects: Corrado Feroci; Ercole Manfredi

Government House (Thai: ทำเนียบรัฐบาล; RTGS: thamniap ratthaban) refers to the offices of the Prime Minister of Thailand and appointed cabinet ministers. It contains conference rooms and is used for state functions and receptions of foreign guests. It consists of several palace-like structures extending over 11 acres (45,000 m^{2}).

== History ==
King Vajiravudh (Rama VI) commissioned the Italian architect Annibale Rigotti to design the main building in 1923, although construction remained incomplete as Rigotti returned to Italy after the king's death in 1925. The house was originally called Baan Norasingha (Thai: บ้านนรสิงห์). Initially intended as a family residence for one of the king's favorite generals, General Chao Phraya Ram Rakop, the building became the prime minister's office in 1941. Prime Minister Plaek Phibunsongkhram then assigned Italian sculptor and artist Corrado Feroci to complete construction (Ercole Manfredi was also working on the building at this point as the architect). The main building is crowned with a golden dome housing a statue of Phra Phrom, and its façade resembles that of the Ca' d'Oro Palazzo in Venice.

During the 2008 Thai political crisis, the People's Alliance for Democracy (PAD) protesters besieged the Government House. After a court order, they had to move, but then attempted to block the government house once more and succeeded. The cabinet temporarily moved to Don Mueang International Airport. The protesters then besieged Don Mueang International Airport shortly after, leaving the cabinet with nowhere to work. On 1 December 2008, after three months of protesting, the protesters left Government House due to ongoing attacks. Government House was again besieged in December 2013 during the 2013–2014 Thai political crisis.

== Thai-Khu-Fah Building ==
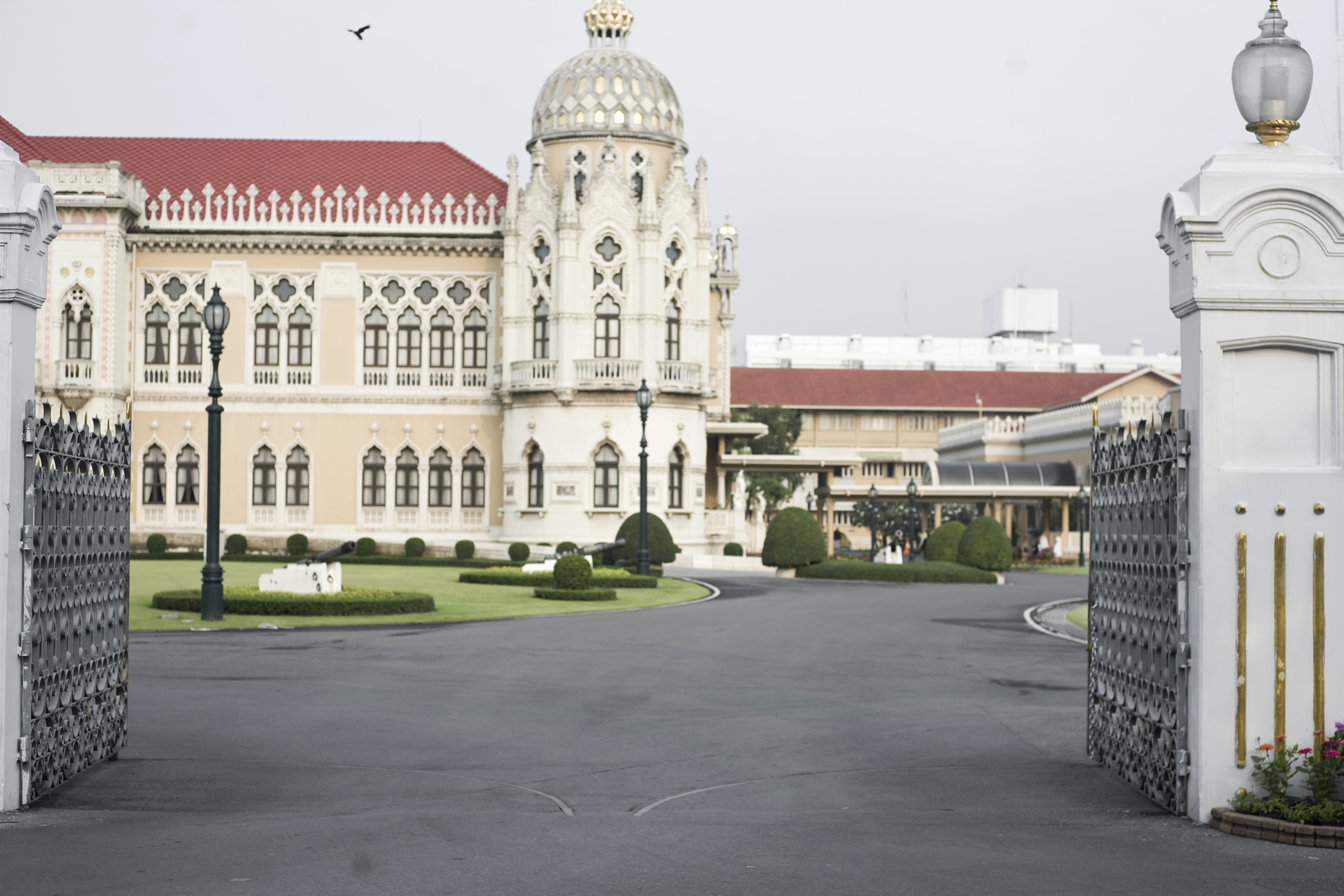
The front of the Thai-Khu-Fah Building, Government House

The Thai-Khu-Fah Building (Thai: ตึกไทยคู่ฟ้า) is an important building on the Government House grounds. The building is home to the Cabinet of Thailand and the Office of the Prime Minister. The prime minister does not live in this building. The Phitsanulok Mansion nearby is the official residence of the prime minister.

The building has two floors, with neo-Venetian Gothic architecture combined with Byzantine art, and one staircase. On the roof, there is a small shrine to Phra Phrom.

Downstairs are three lounges. The first is the Golden Dome Room (Thai: ห้องโดมทอง) on the south side of the building for the prime minister's guests. The second is the Ivory Room (Thai: ห้องสีงาช้าง), which is in front of the Golden Dome Room and to the right, a lounge for the prime minister's official visitors. The third is the Purple Room (Thai: ห้องสีม่วง), which is on the ground floor, to the right-hand side of the building. This is a lounge for the visitors of the deputy prime minister and other cabinet ministers.

The building has a small conference room called the Green Room (Thai: ห้องสีเขียว) for the Board of Committees, chaired by the prime minister. The upper floor of the building houses the prime minister's office, the offices of political officers, and the old cabinet conference room.

== Gallery ==
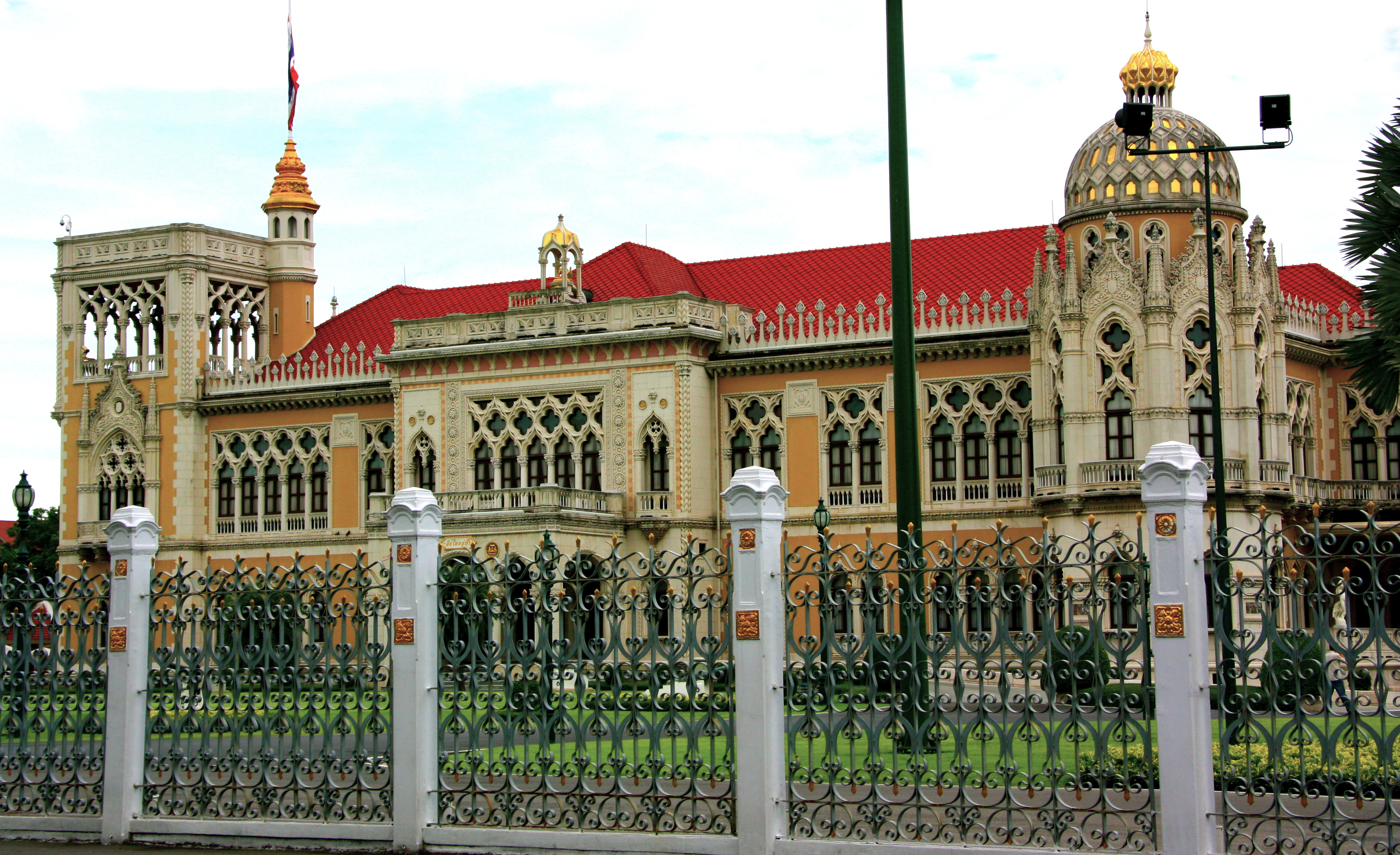
The front of Government House of Thailand

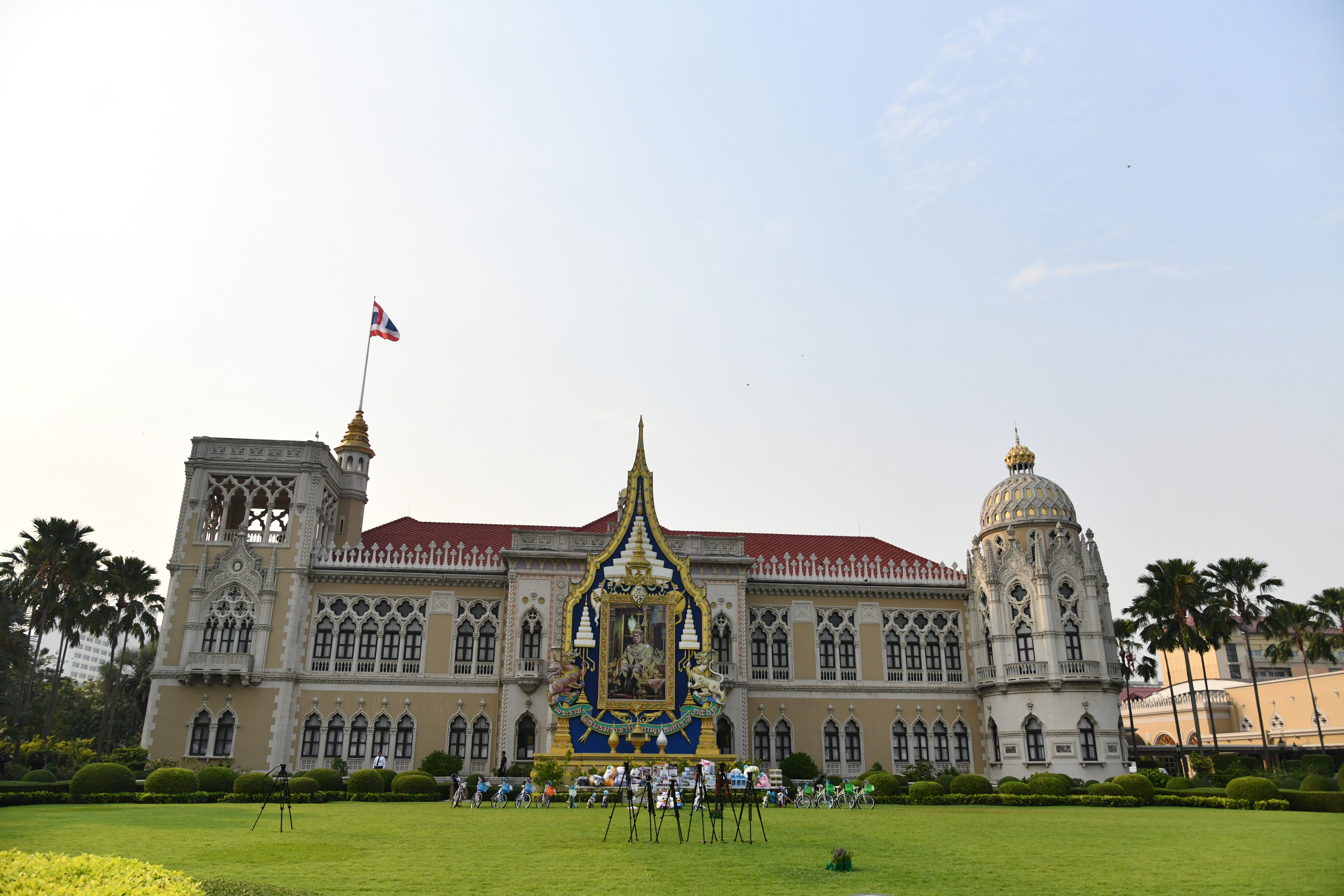
Thai-Khu-Fah building

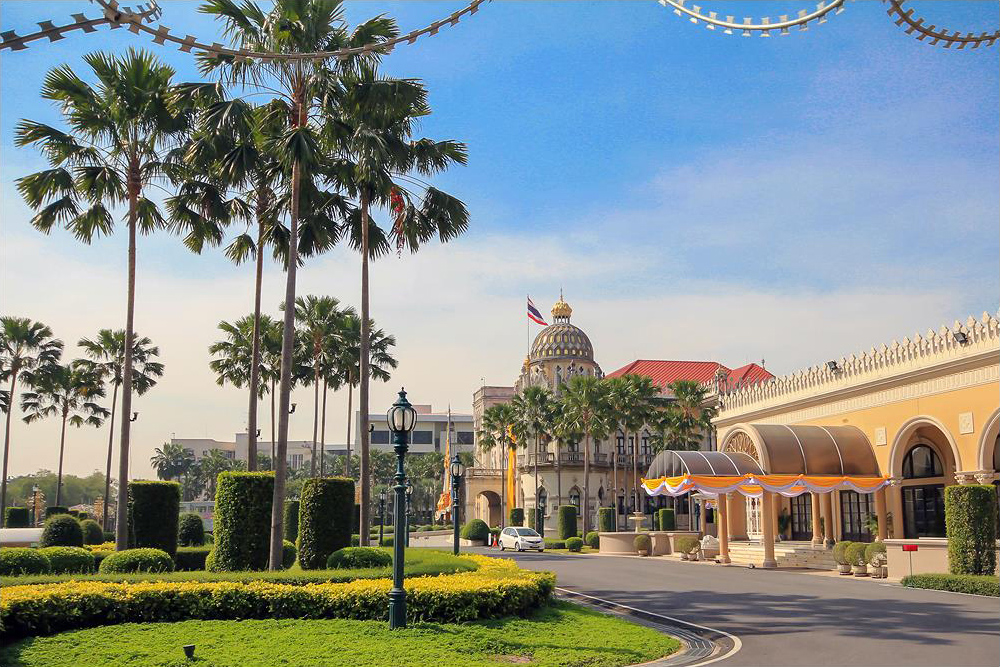
Thai-Khu-Fah building and Santi Maitree building

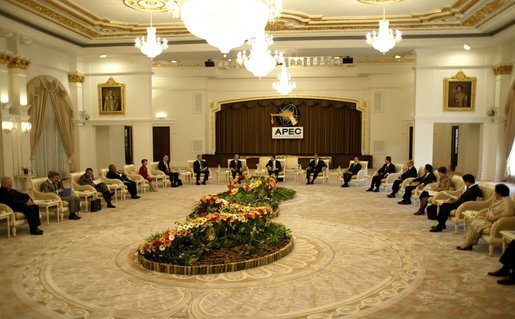
APEC 2003, Government House

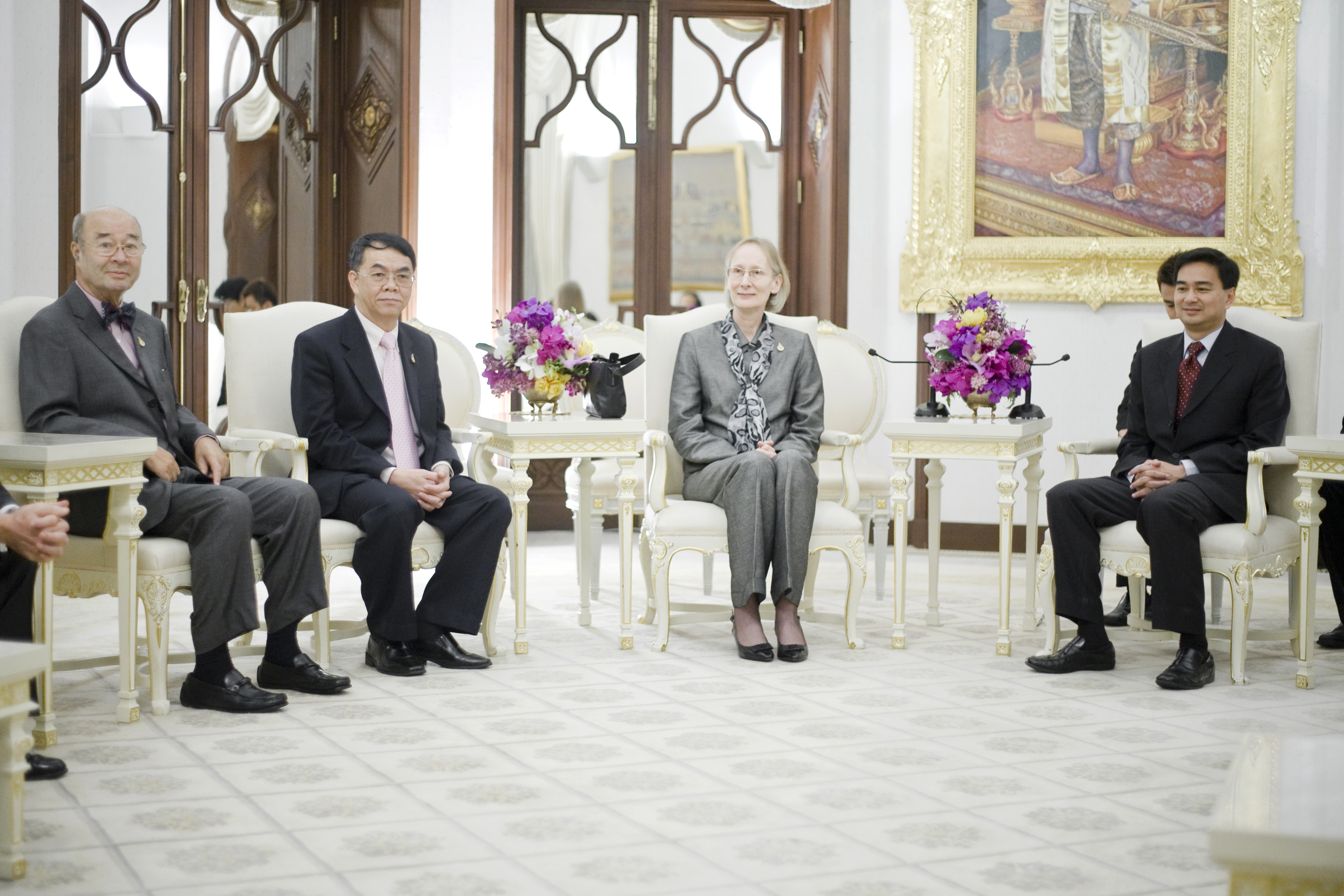
Prime Minister Abhisit Vejjajiva (right) with guests in the Ivory Room

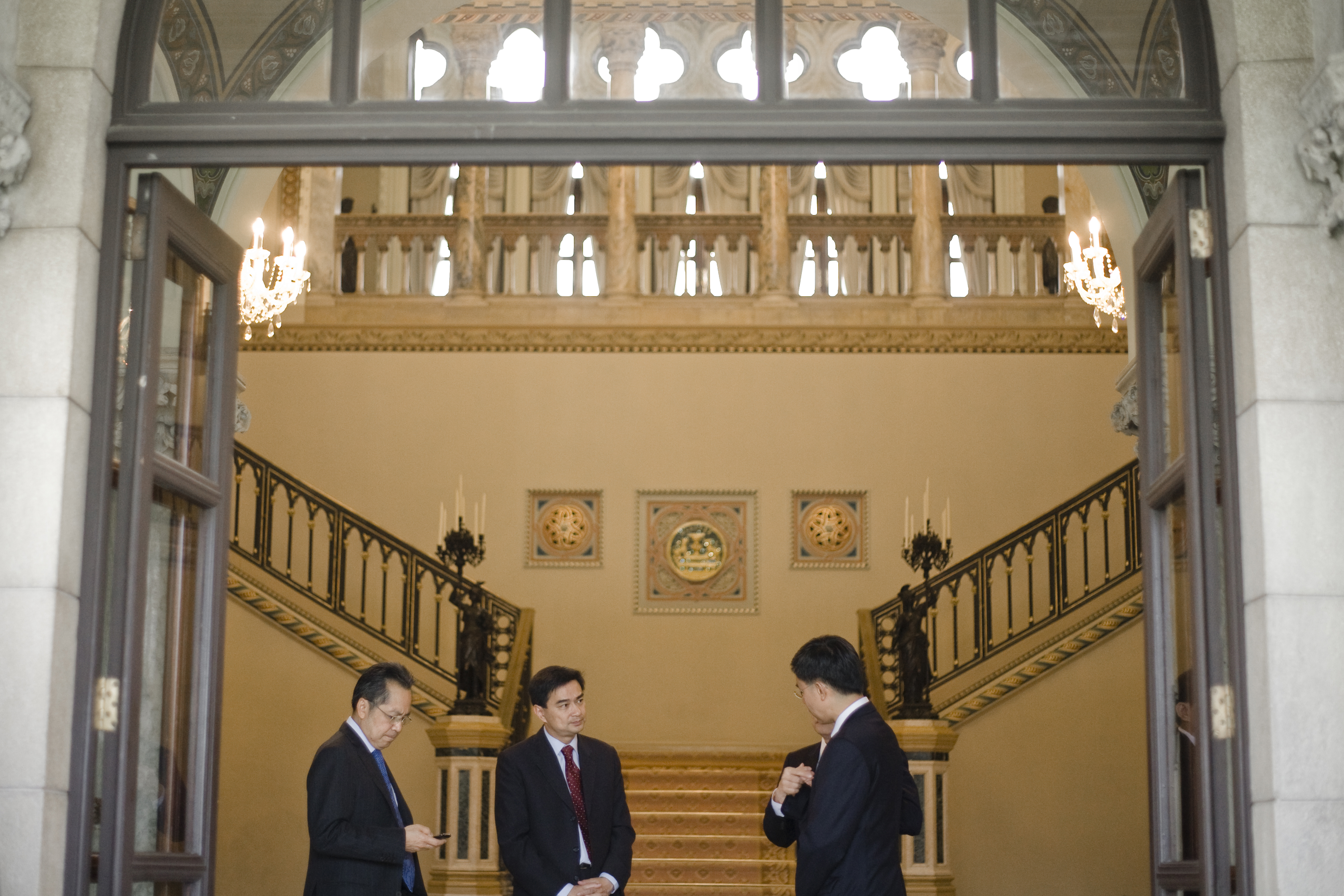
Entrance, Government House

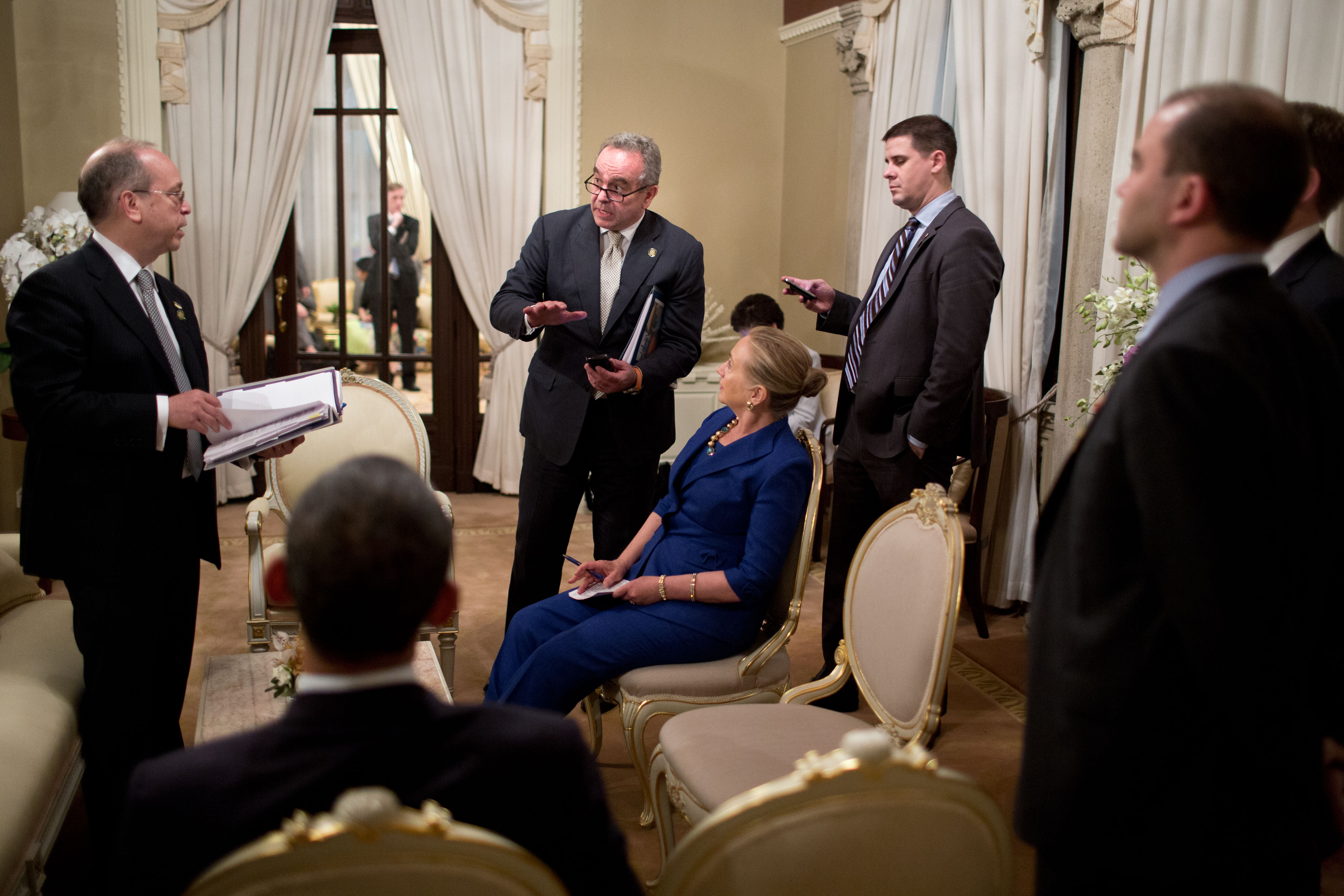
US President Barack Obama, Government House

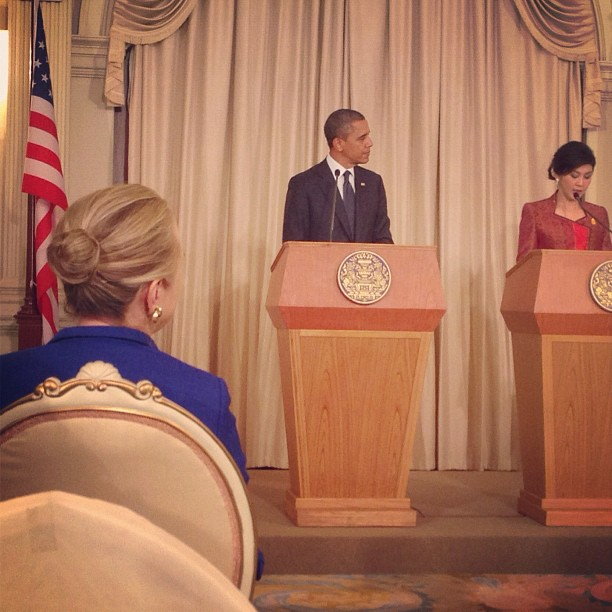
Press Conference Room
