= Mrigadayavan Palace =

Former royal residence in Thailand

Coordinates: 12°41′52″N 99°57′48″E

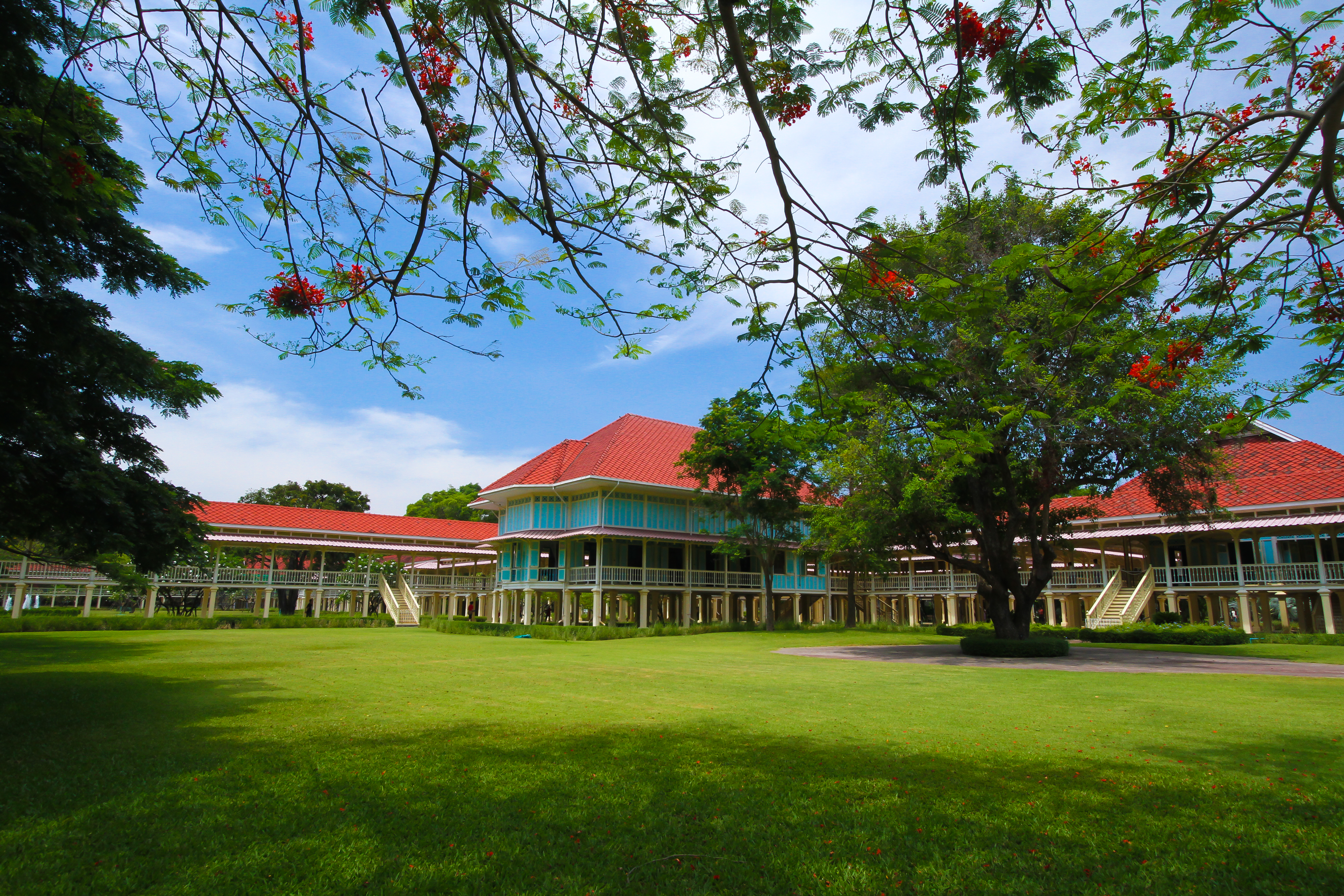
Mrigadayavan Palace

Mrigadayavan Palace (Thai: พระราชนิเวศน์มฤคทายวัน, RTGS: phra ratcha niwet maruekkhathayawan ) is a former residence of King Vajiravudh, or Rama VI, who ruled Siam from 1910 to 1925. It is in Cha-am in Phetchaburi Province, Thailand. King Vajiravudh visited the palace twice during his reign. His first visit was during the summer of 1924 when he stayed for three months. His second visit lasted two months in the summer of 1925, after which he died. The palace is now a property of the Crown Property Bureau and is under the management of The Foundation of Mrigadayavan Palace under the patronage of Princess Bejaratana (FMP), the only daughter of Vajiravudh.

== History ==
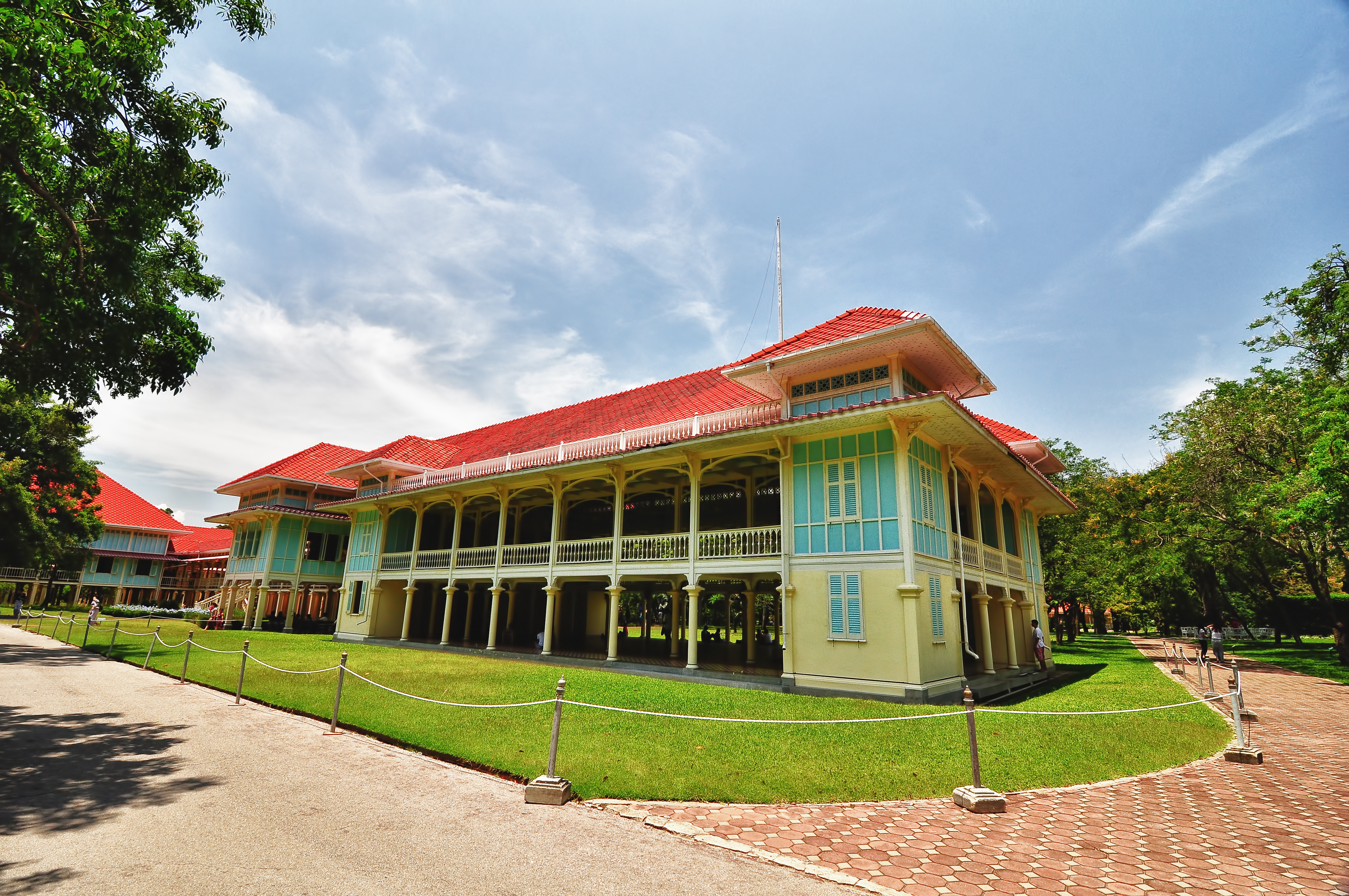
Mrigadayavan Palace

The palace was commissioned by King Vajiravudh to serve as a holiday villa. The king drafted the designs for the villa, which consists of sixteen teak buildings raised on concrete pillars and linked together by a series of walkways. Construction took place during 1923–1924, overseen by Italian architect, Ercole Manfredi.

Around the year 1917, because King Vajiravudh had suffered from rheumatoid arthritis, his physician, Phraya Phaet Phongsavisuttatibhadi, suggested that he sojourn in a warm and airy seaside climate. Mrigadayavan Palace was thus constructed in 1923. At first, there were three choices of sites for building the summer palace. The first one was in Hua Hin District, Prachuap Khiri Khan Province, which was already a popular beach destination at that time. However, since the customary law prohibited the general public from entering areas where the king resided, King Vajiravudh decided to avoid troubling his people and considered alternative locations for a summer palace. He subsequently commanded the Royal Thai Navy to research appropriate sites. The beach at Bang Thalu in Phetchaburi was its first choice. This led to the construction of a summer palace in 1917 at Bang Thalu. The adjoining beach area was renamed Chao Samran Beach, which means 'the beach of joy'.

The king stayed at the new palace every summer between 1918 and 1923. Apart from caring for his health, he also permitted the training of the Phetchaburi Wild Tiger Corps inside the palace compound. Later on, this training ground became known as Had Chao.

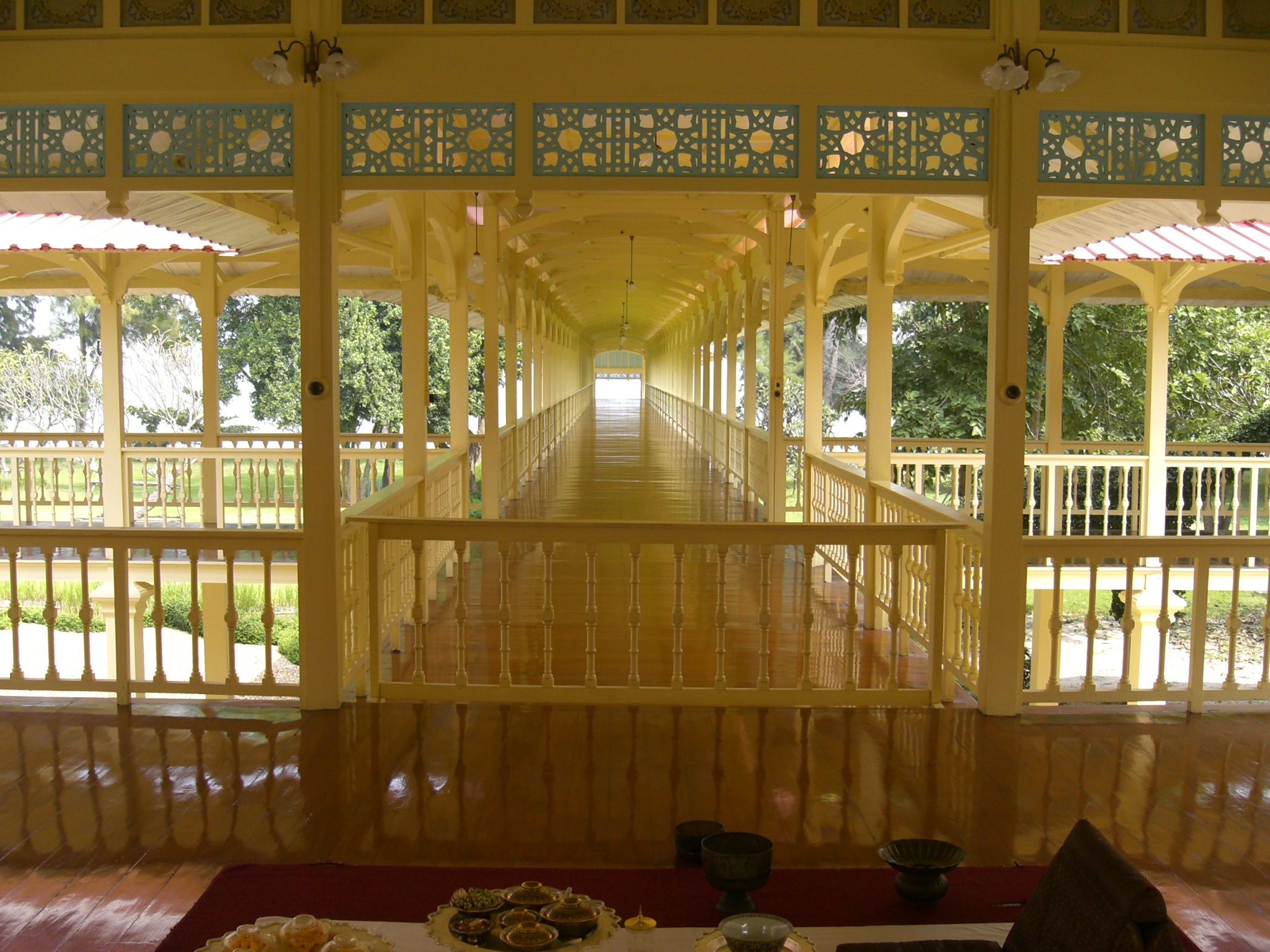
Inside Mrigadayavan Palace

Yearly visits gradually became the norm for the royal court. Several inconveniences were encountered. First of all, there was a lack of fresh water as indicated in the royal log book on a shortage of water during one summer. Secondly, it was inconvenient to travel between Chao Samran beach and Phetchaburi town. Only 15 kilometres distant, it took around five hours to get to the beach. Last, as Chao Samran beach was adjacent to a fishing village, flies were an ever present nuisance. King Vajiravudh decided to move his seaside residence to a new location.

Finally, a secluded beach at Huai Sai Nua was found. It was between Chao Samran Beach and Hua Hin. The site was not only close to the train station, permitting easy access from the capital, but had abundant water.

King Vajiravud appointed Ercole Manfredi, an Italian architect, who at the time was employed by the Ministry of Public Works, as the chief architect to complete the architectural plan based on the king's preliminary sketch, and assigned Chao Phraya Yommaraj (Pan Sukhum), Minister of Interior, to supervise construction. Existing residential edifices and structures at Chao Samran Beach were moved to the new site while the royal residence was being built. The construction started in 1923 and was completed in late-1924.

The area was called Huai Sai, which means 'hog deer's stream', due to the number of hog deer found in this area. King Vajiravudh, therefore, named his new summer palace "Mrigadayavan". The word "Mrigadayavan" is auspicious, as in "Isipatana Mrigadayavan", the deer park in India where Buddha delivered his first sermon. As well as naming the new palace, King Vajiravudh also sought to preserve the area's wildlife. On 12 May 1924, he issued a proclamation declaring the Huai Sai area a wildlife refuge. King Vajiravudh was frugal with the construction of Mrigadayavan Palace. He wanted this seaside palace to be a humble royal residence as compared with other palaces. The palace design was to be simple, yet elegant, in harmony with the tropical seaside climate.

== Gallery ==
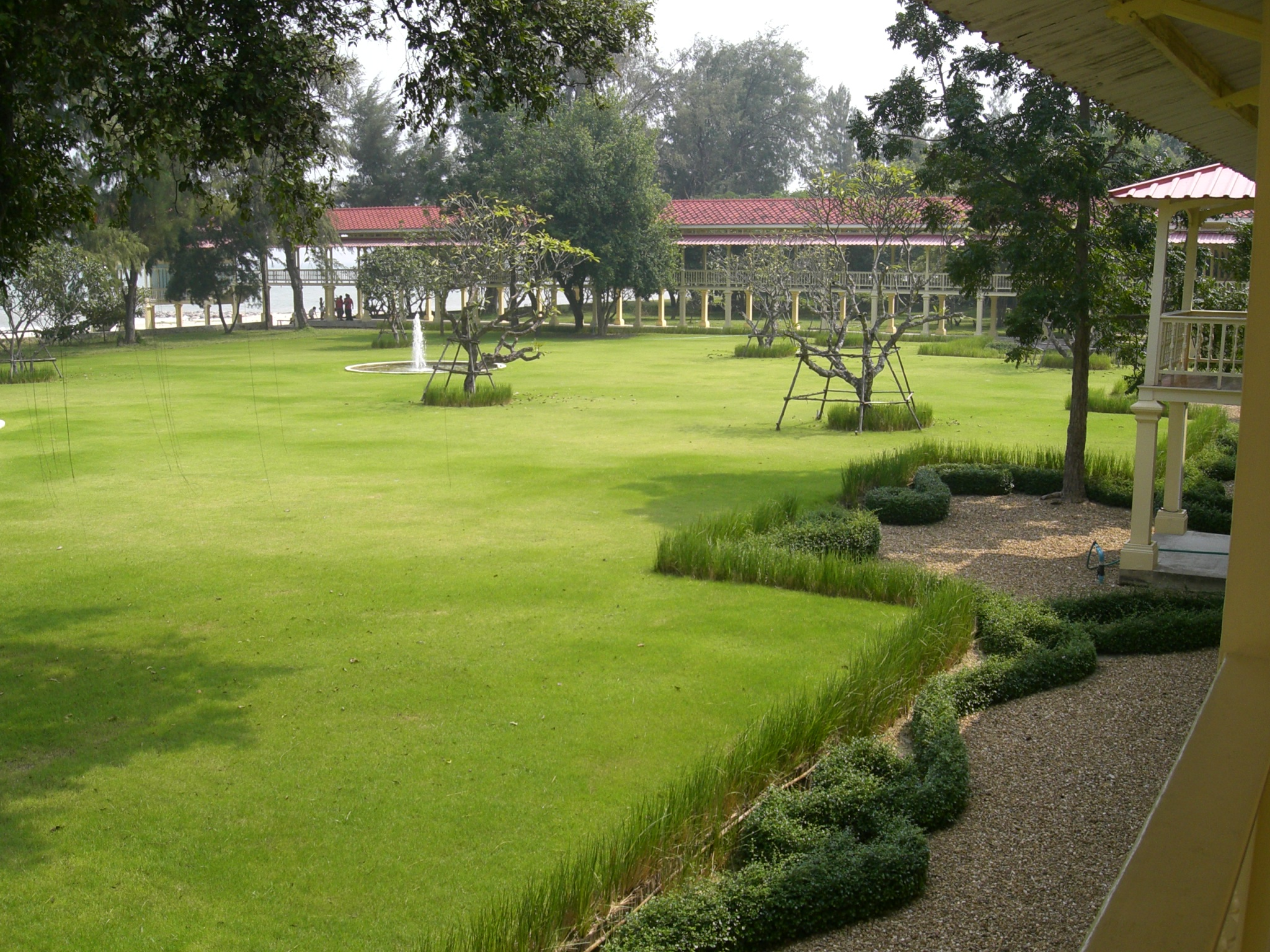

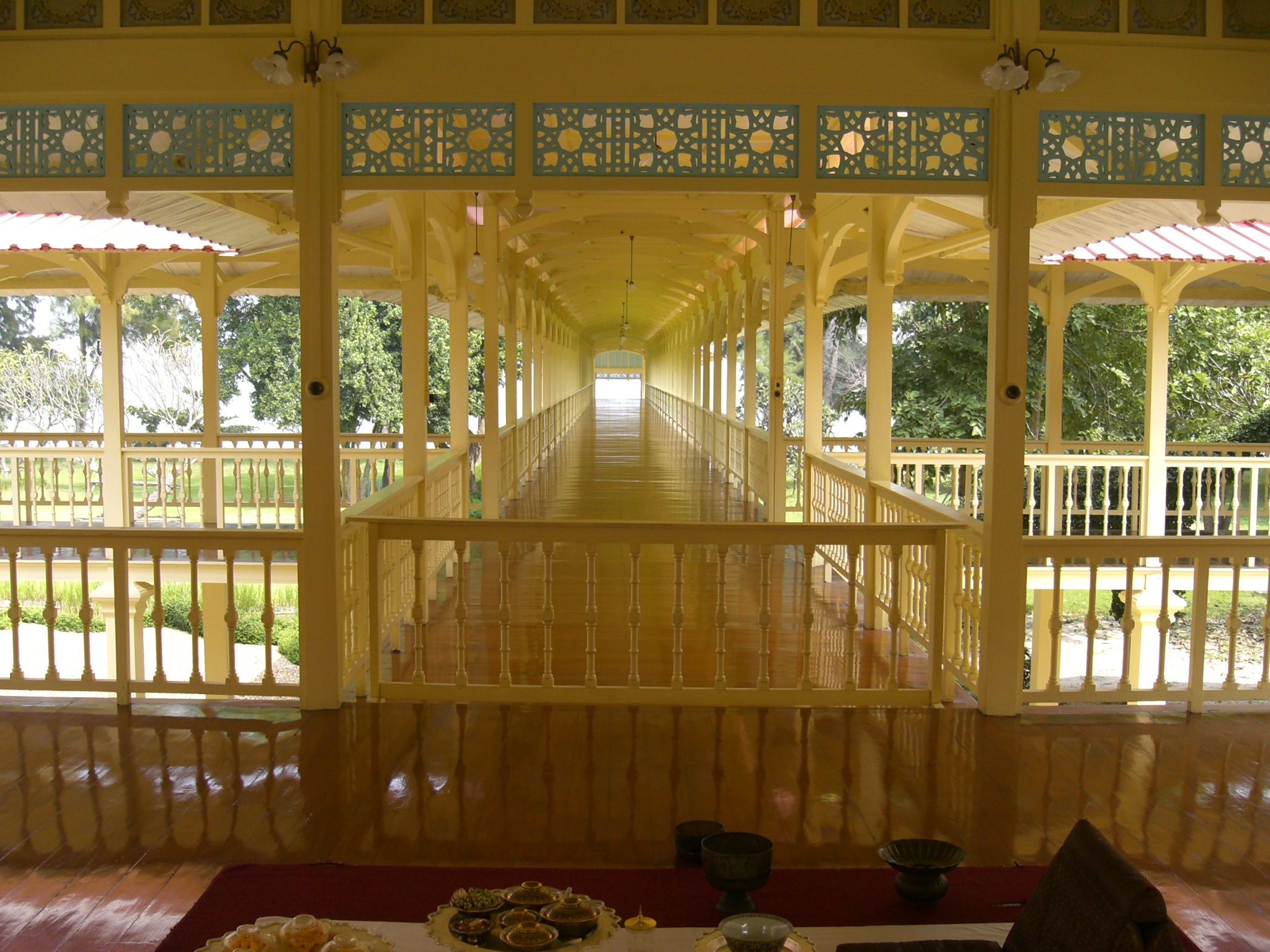

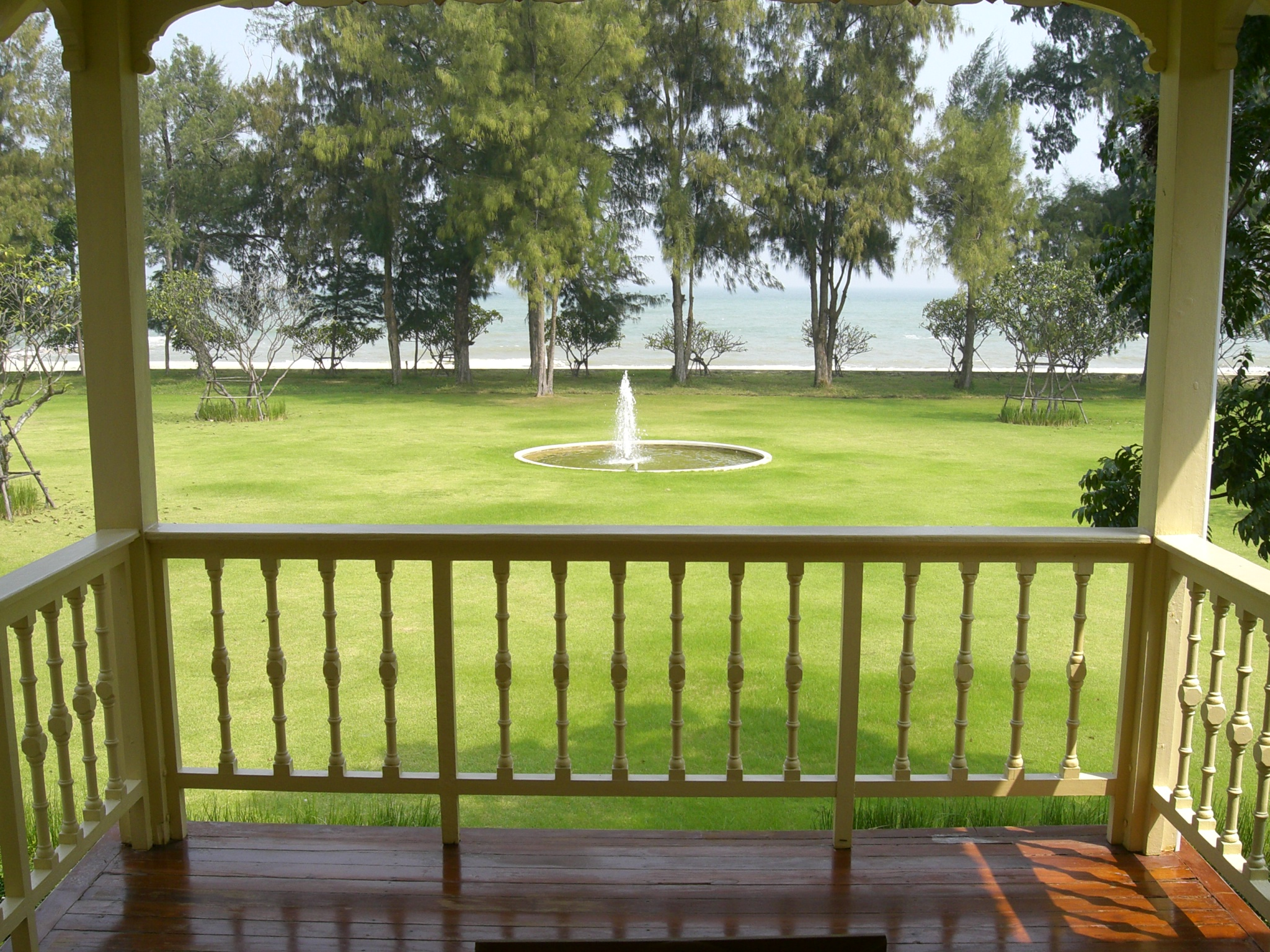

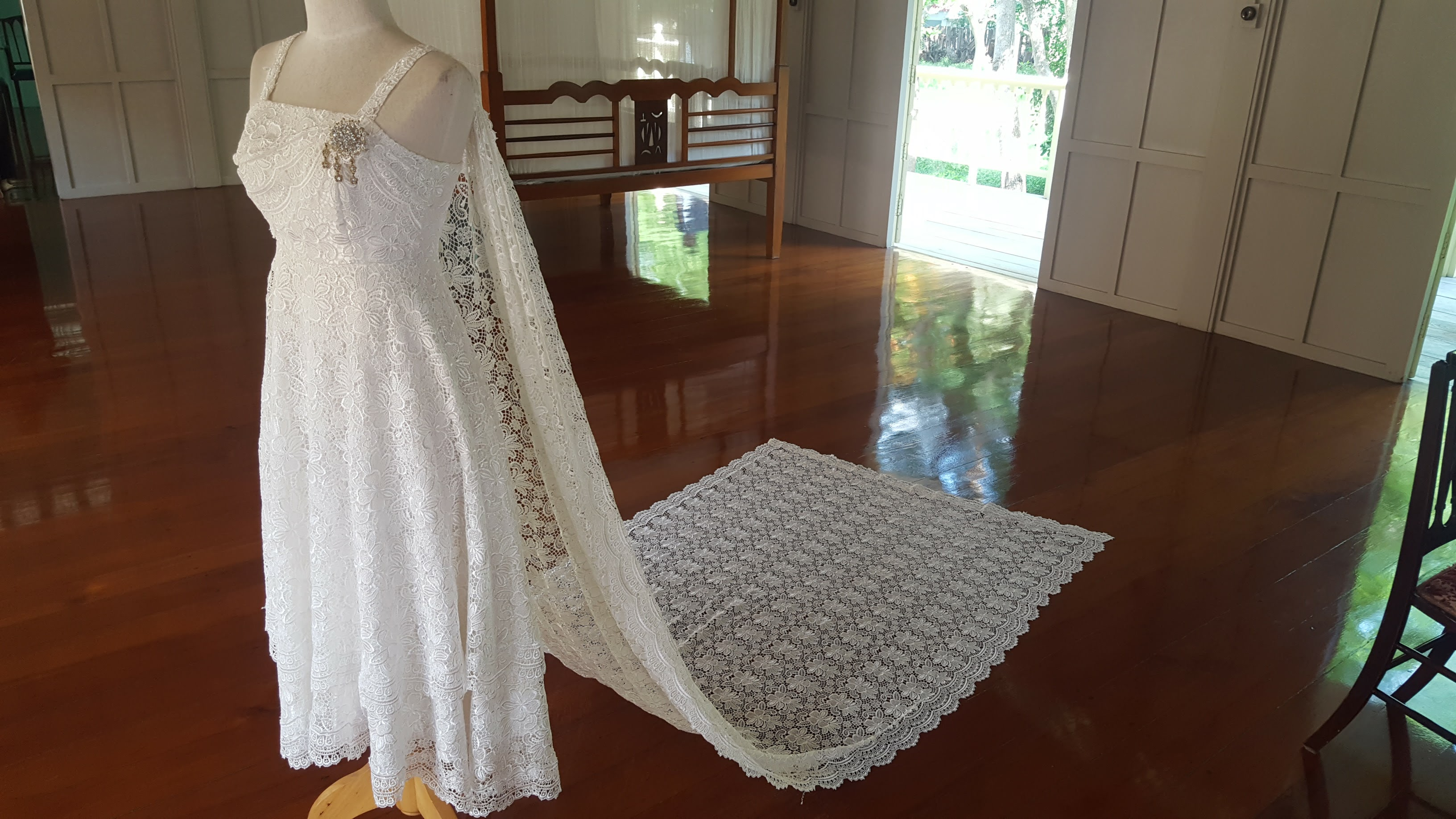

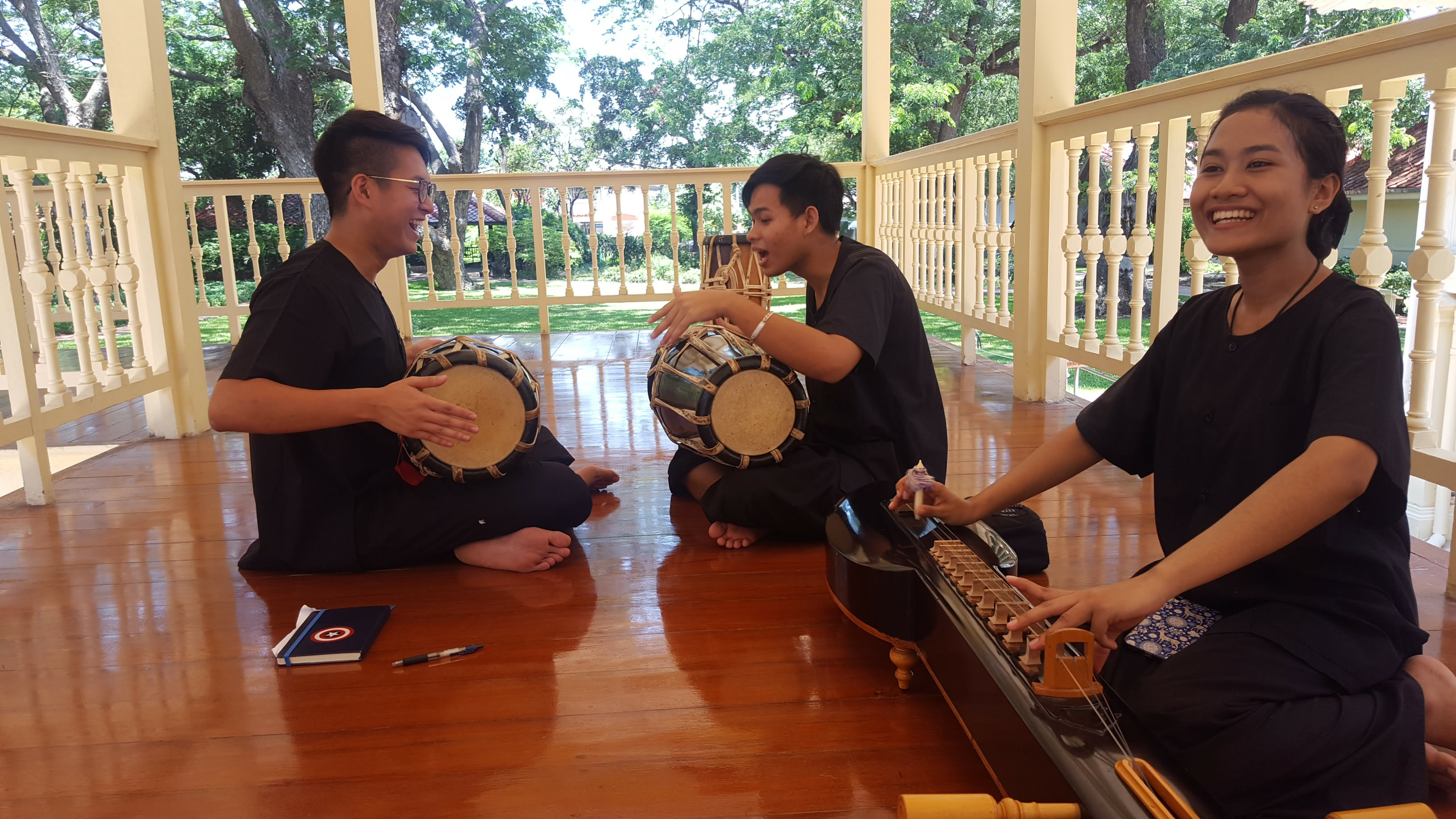

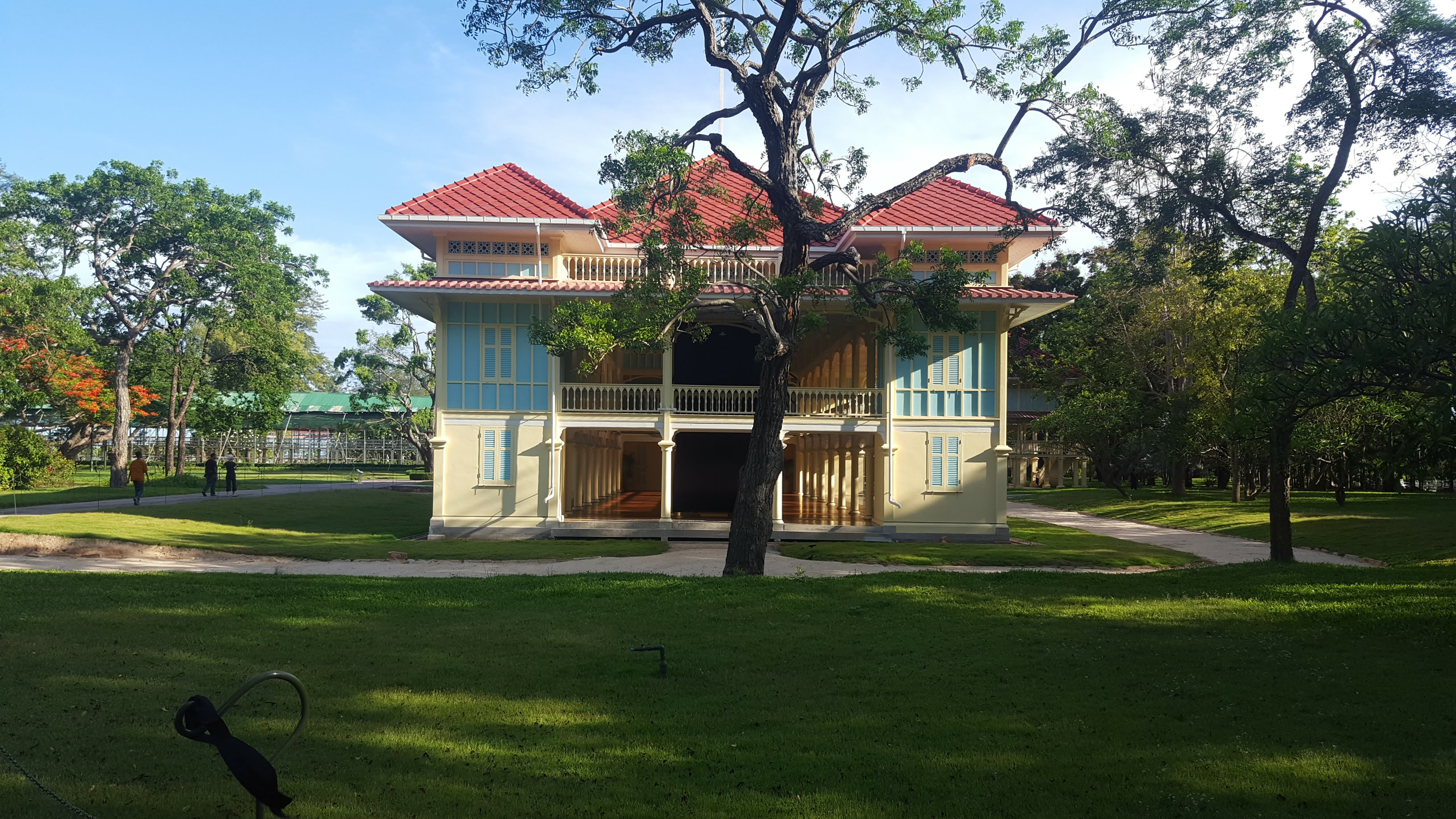

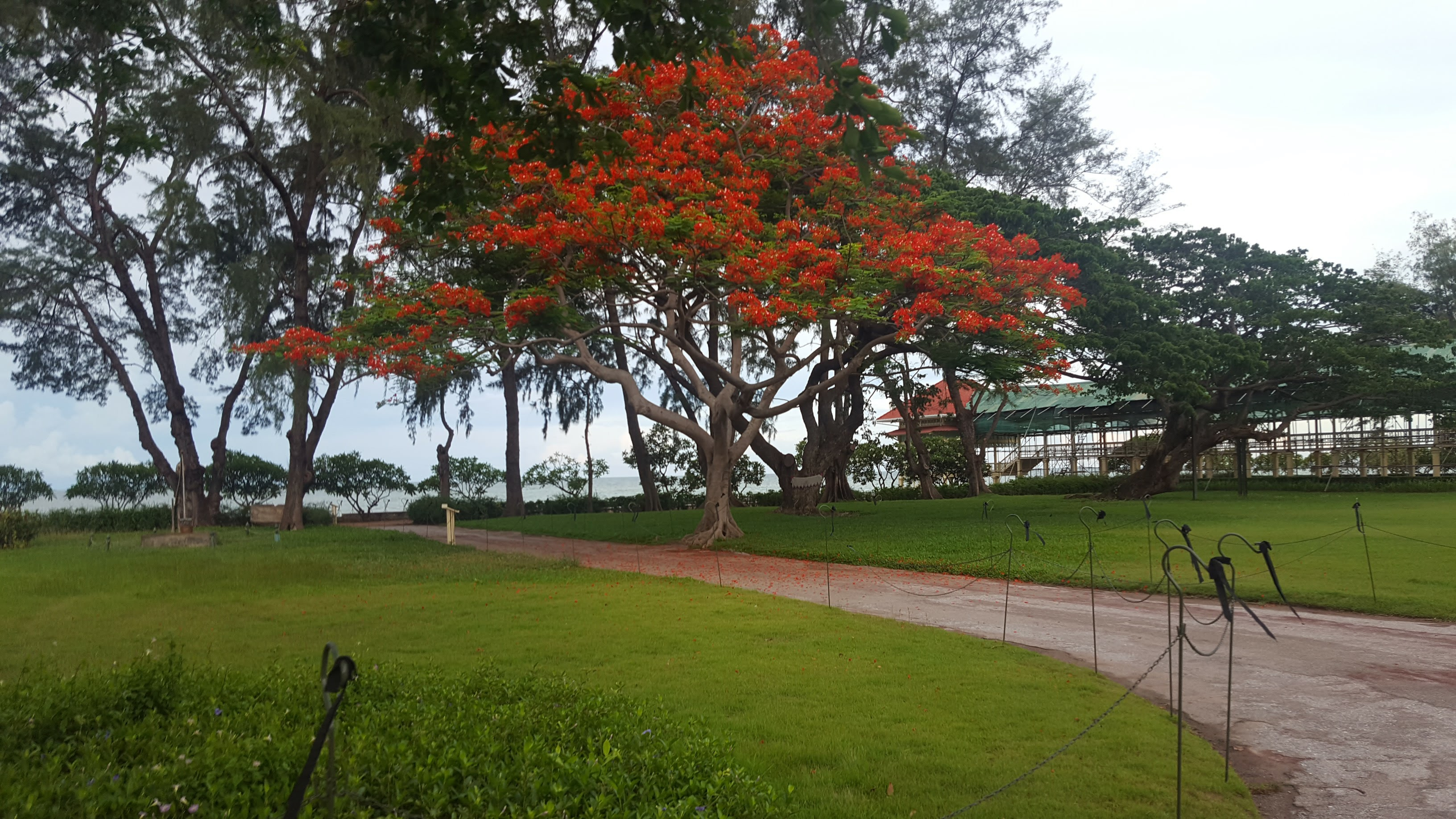

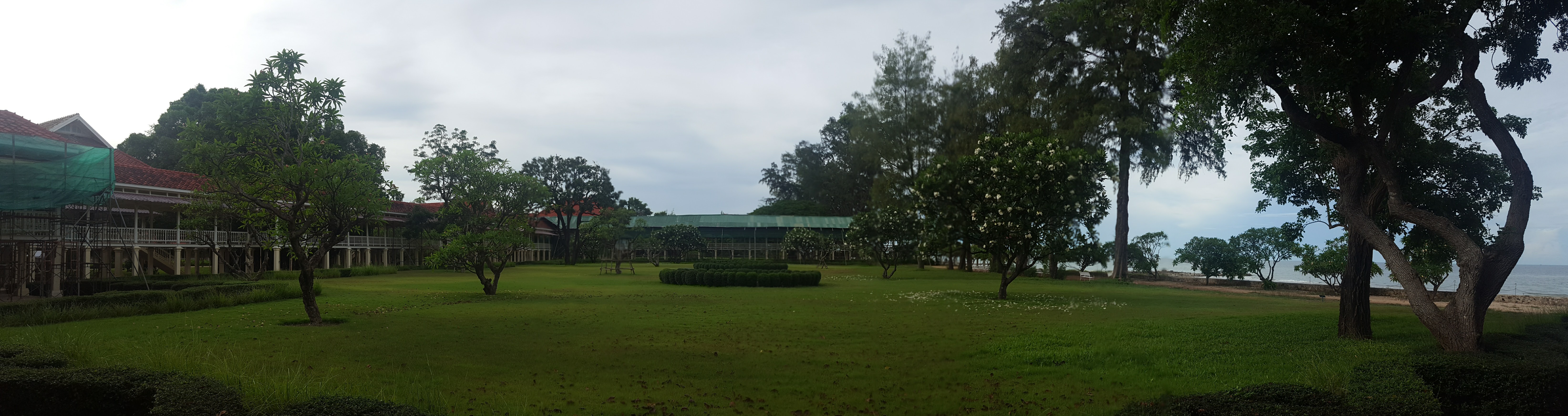

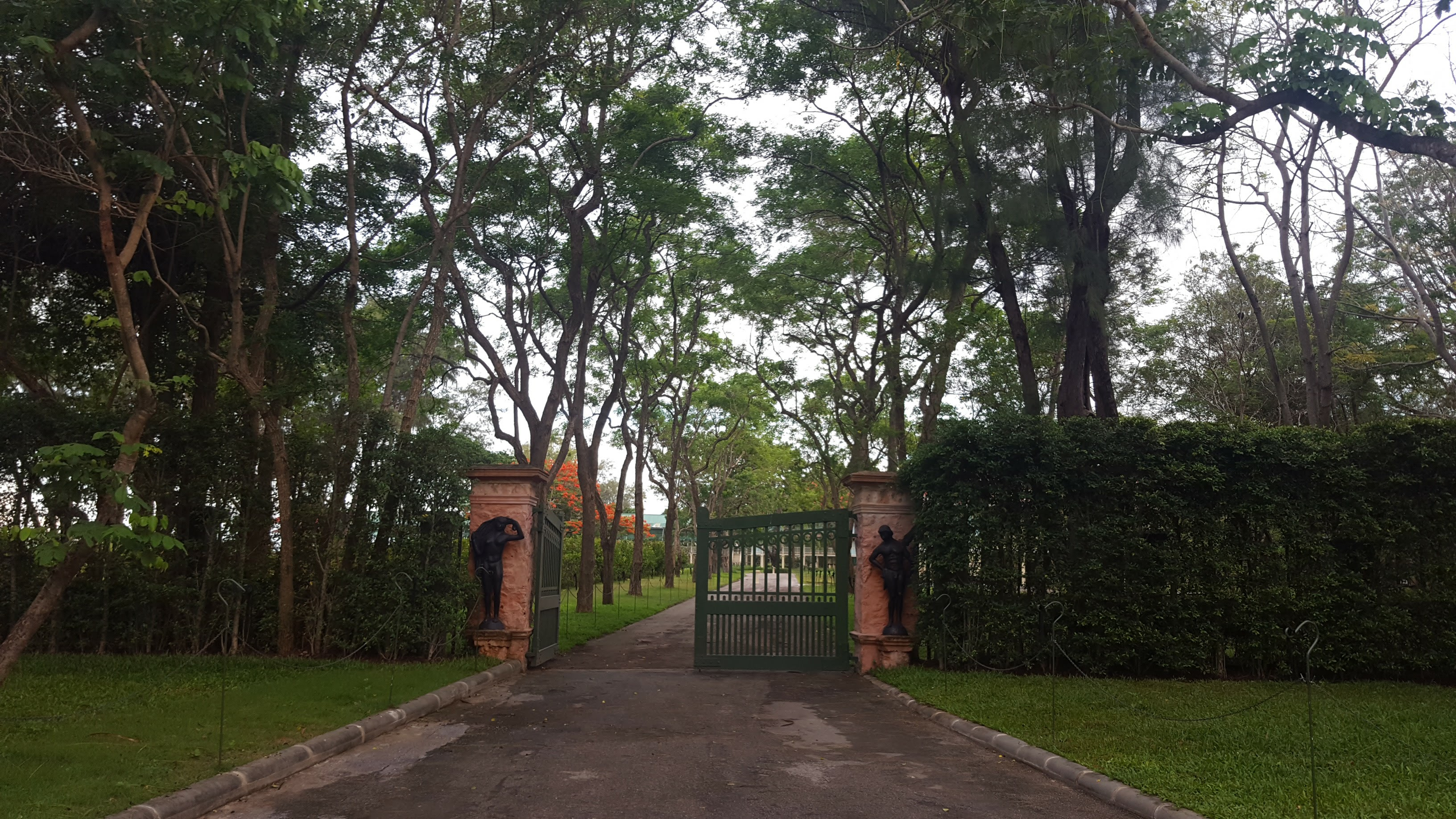

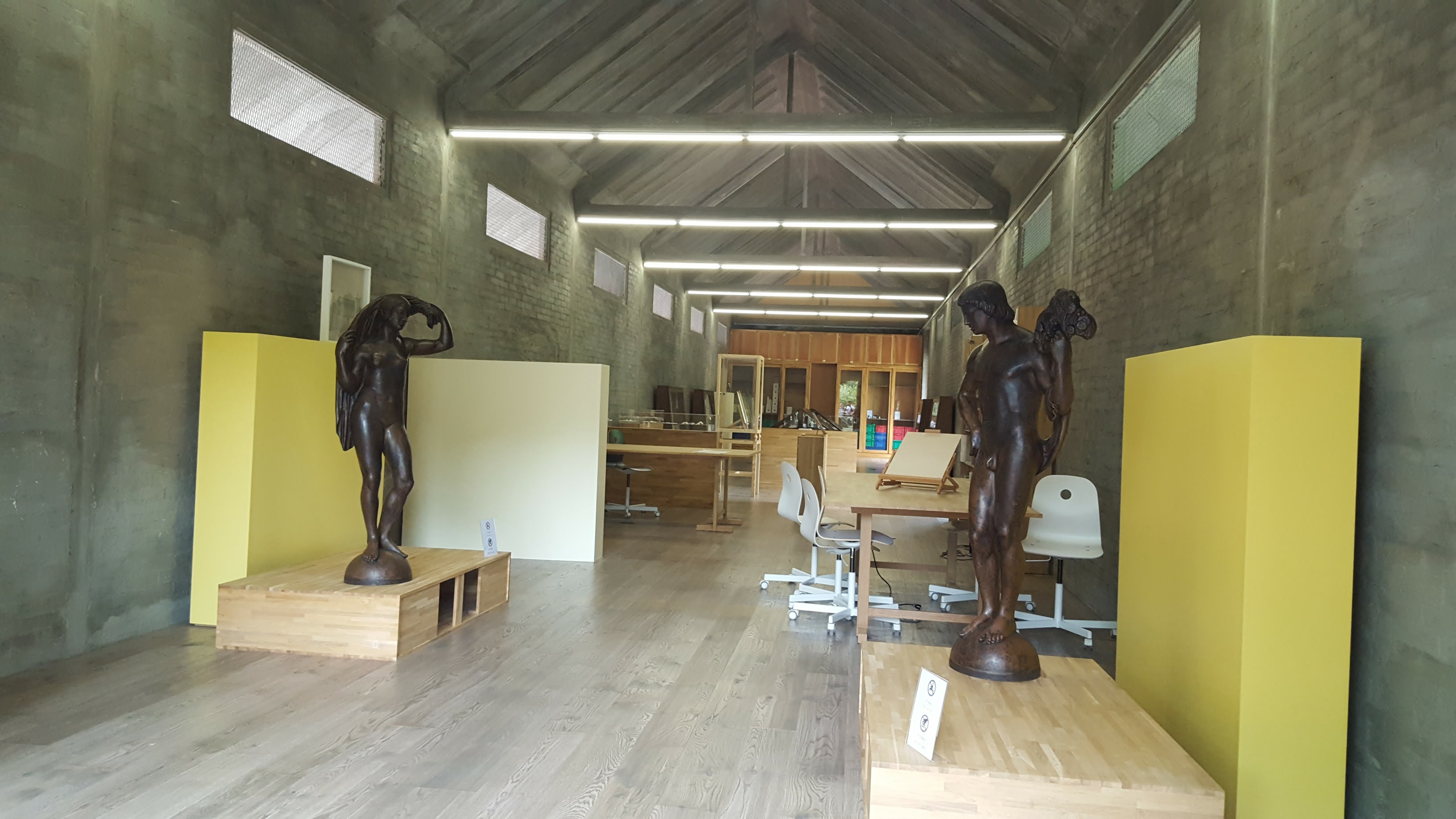

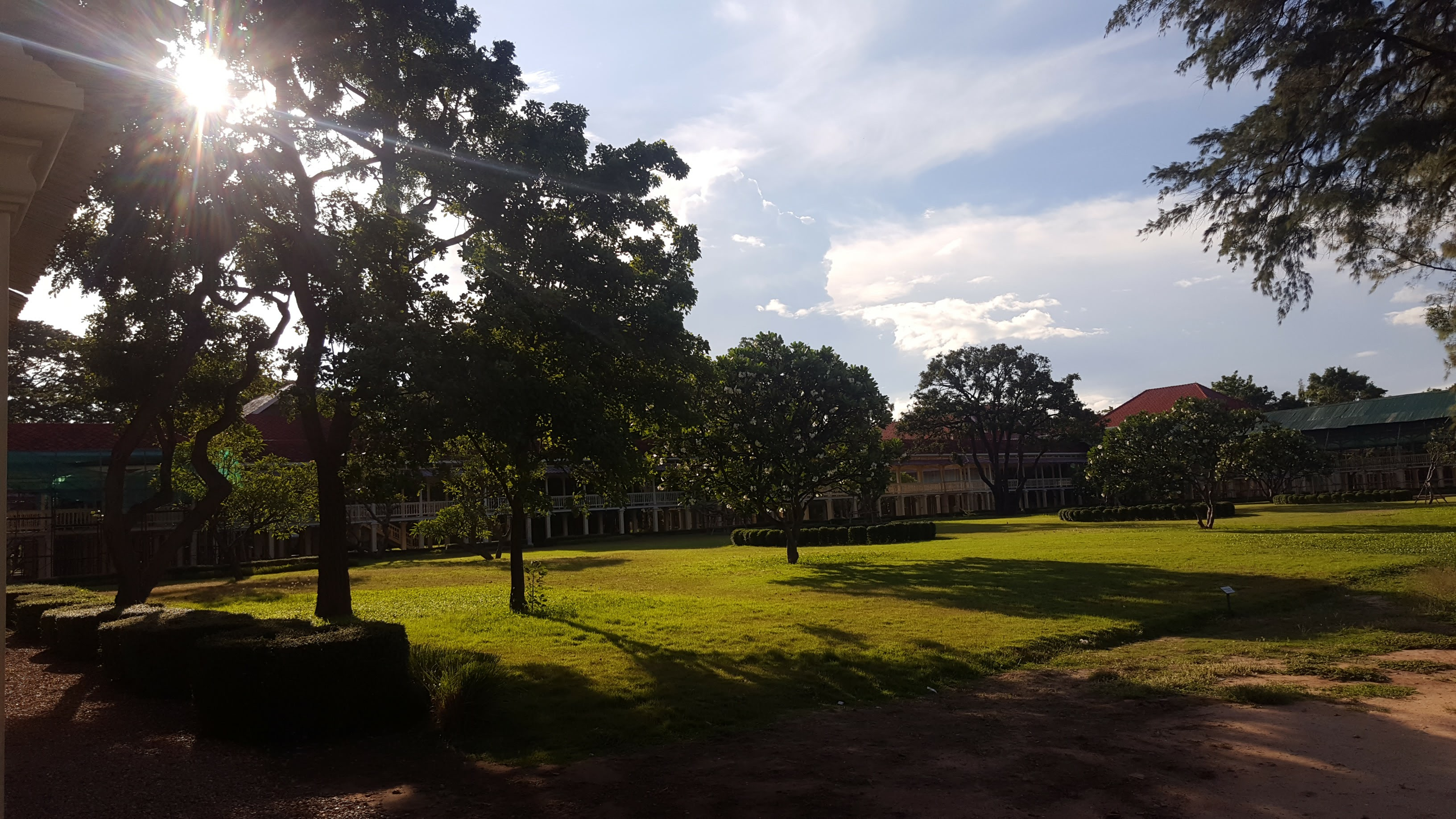

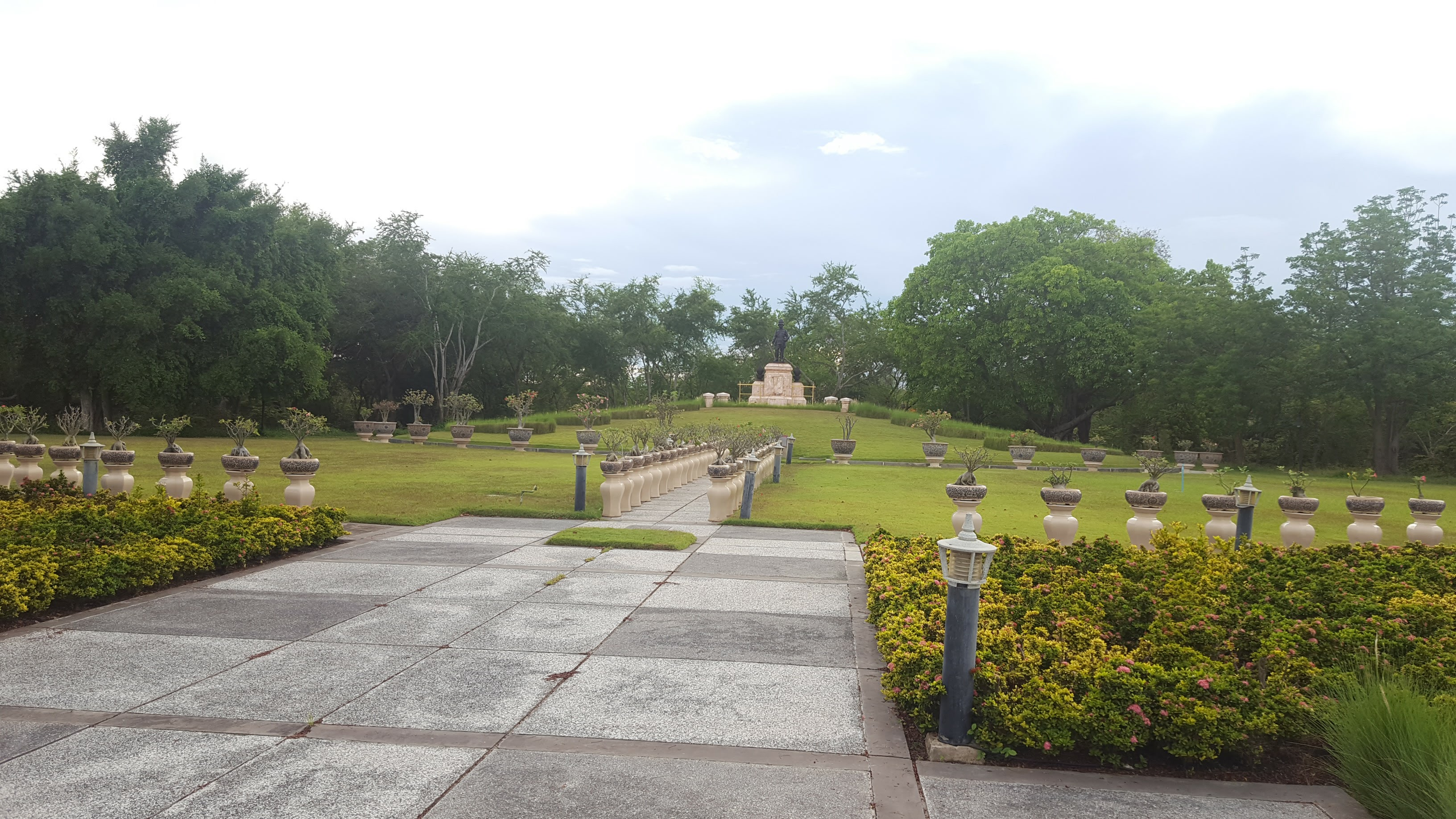

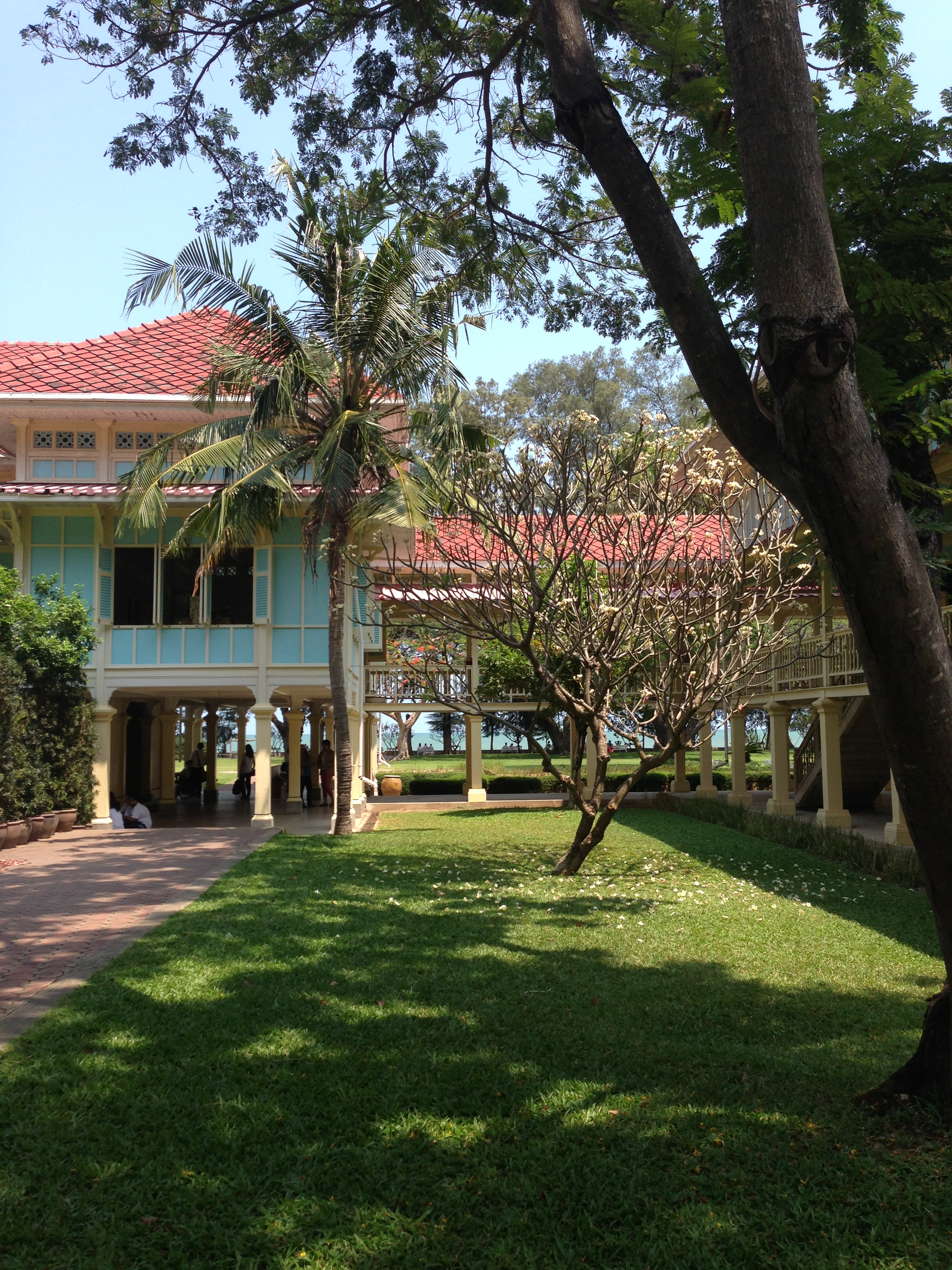

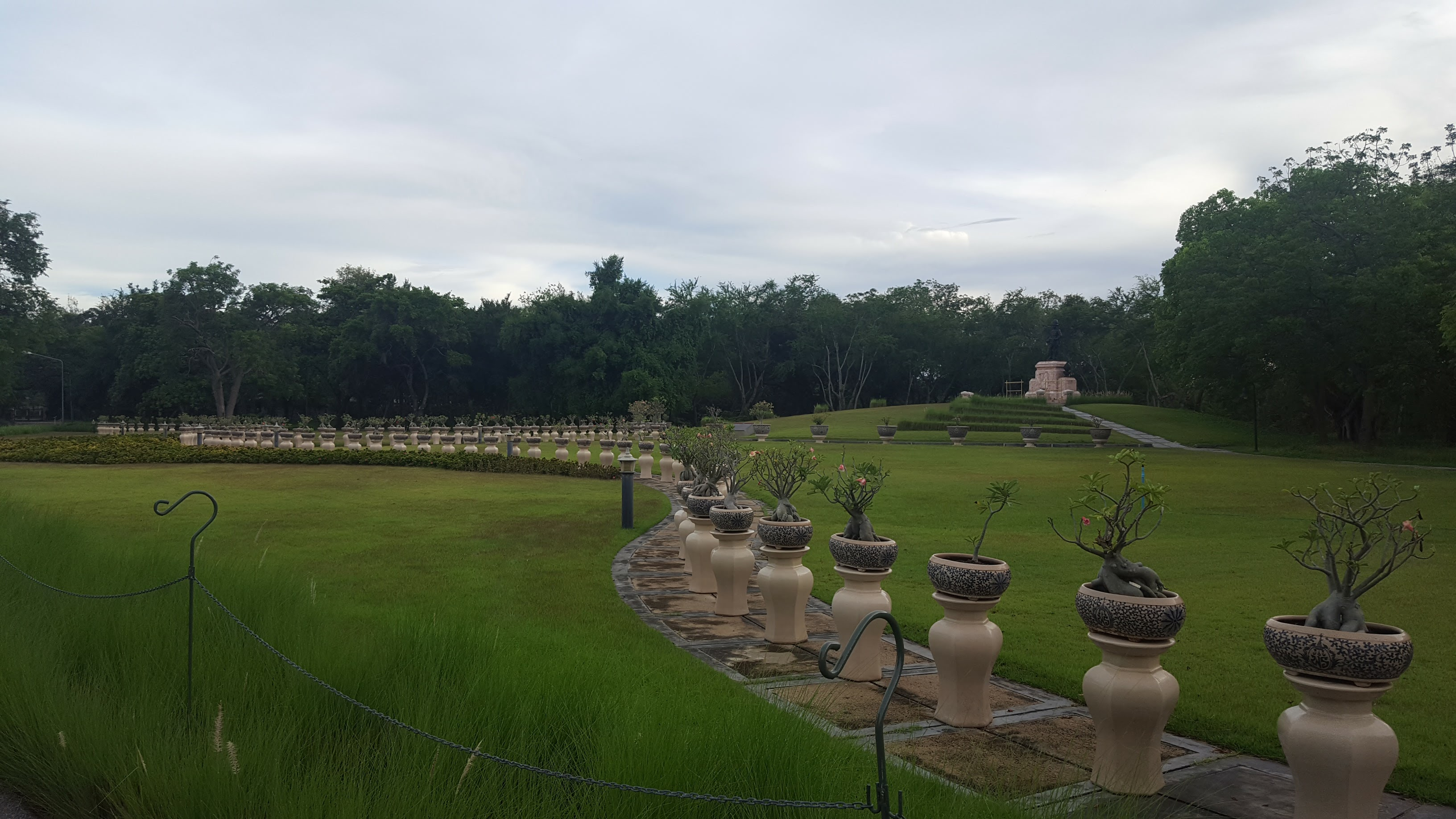

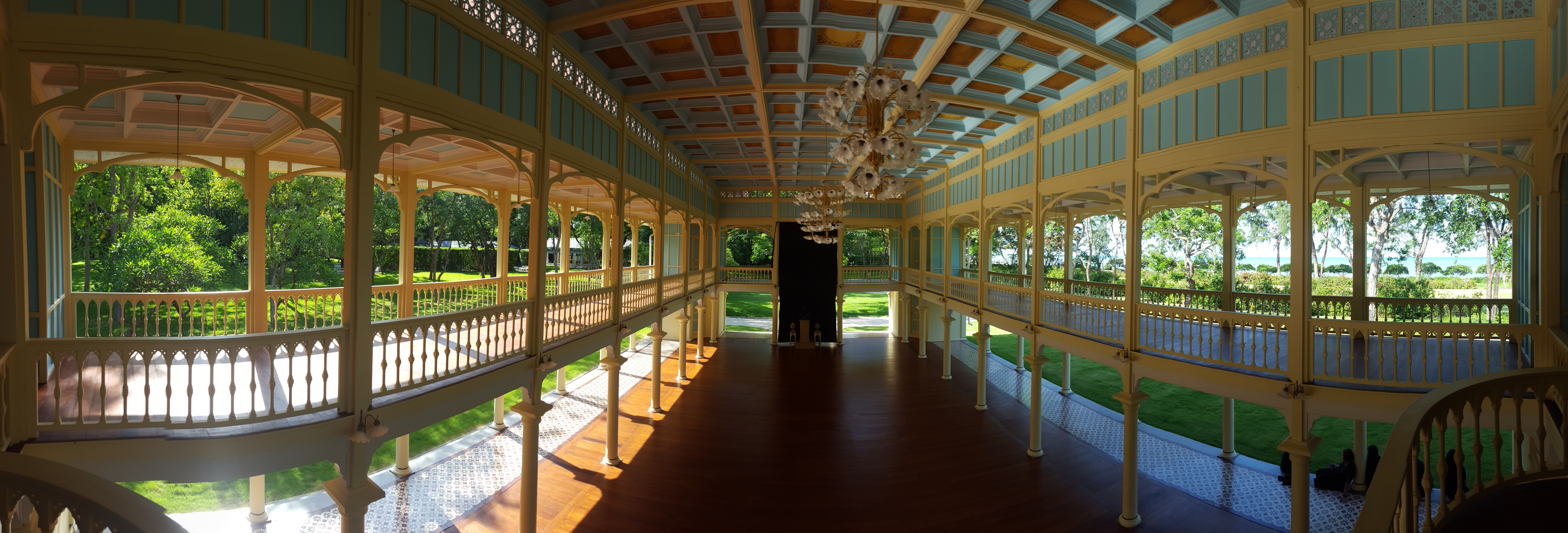

== Buildings ==
Mrigadayavan Palace includes three groups of buildings with 16 small buildings. They were connected to each other by a long covered wooden corridor. The overall length of the palace is 399 metres. Twenty-two staircases allow access to the private quarters. The palace is aligned parallel to the sea with a long corridor leading towards bathing pavilions at each end to allow sea breezes during the day and mountain breeze at night.

The palace's three groups of buildings are:

a) Samosorn Sevakamart

b) Samutphiman Group of Buildings (Men's Quarters)

c) Pisansakorn Group of Buildings (Ladies’ Quarters)

=== Samosorn Sevakamart ===
Samosorn Sevakamart is at the north end of the palace. Its name foretells the function of the building. Samosorn means 'assembly', and sevakamart means 'royal officials'. King Vajiravudh used it as a meeting hall with his officials, guest reception room, ritual room, theatre, including a badminton court.

This open, high-ceilinged hall is rectangular. The ceiling of is decorated with painted coffers and large chandeliers. As this hall frequently served as a theatre, there are dressing rooms at each corner of the hall.

There is a circular staircase in the northern rooms, which was used by actors when this hall was converted into a theatre. The audience would face to the north and the ladies of the court were seated along the east and west balconies of the upper floor. King Vajiravudh usually rehearsed his plays in this hall after dinner. Nevertheless, when not performing himself, he would watch performances of his cousins and courtiers from the south balcony. The king also gave performances of his own works to the general public at Mrigadayavan Palace.

Phra Ruang was performed on 10 June 1924 as part of a birthday celebration for Queen Indrasakdisaji. King Vajiravudh played the role of Nai Mun Puenyao, a commoner, and Phranang Chao Suvadhana, who at that time Miss Kruakaew Abhayavongse, performed as Nang Chandra, the maid who had a dialogue with Nai Mun Puenyao. Vivahaphrasamudra, a Western-style operetta, was performed on 23–25 May 1925. King Vajiravudh performed as King Midas, his last performance.

The grand circular staircase at the entrance was used by King Vajiravudh to access his quarters. The right side of the staircases was used for going up to the second floor, while the left side was for coming down. The direction of going up and down these staircases was done clockwise following Brahmin and Buddhist beliefs to receive grace.

According to Brahmin and Buddhist beliefs, the king represents the most powerful gods- Shiva, Brahma, and Vishnu. Since it is believed that whatever the gods touch would create fire, carpets became a symbolic necessity for the king to walk upon. Brass peg holes used for keeping carpets stationary can be seen on the floor of the upper corridor, as well as along the stair treads, where the king walked.

King Vajiravudh used the room on the upper floor of the Samosorn Sevakamart for private audiences and to conduct royal ceremonies. Two significant merit-making ceremonies were carried out at Mrigadayavan Palace. The first one was a merit-making ceremony on the anniversary of Queen Indrasakdisaji's birthday in 1924 and the other was on the anniversary of Chao Chom Suvadhana's birthday in 1925. The king also used this audience hall to bless royal family marriages.

On the left side of the hall stands a bronze bust of King Vajiravudh, cast in 1926 by the Italian sculptor, Silpa Bhirasri (Corrado Feroci). Behind the bust bears the legend, "Feroci 1926".

=== Samutphiman buildings (men's quarters) ===
Next to the Audience Hall is Samutphiman Quarter, which was the king's private quarters. Only the king and his close officials were allowed in this area. The name Samutphiman literally means 'home in the ocean', in which samut means 'ocean', and phiman means 'home'. It also refers to the home of Vishnu, the Preserver, who rests on the Naga. This accords with the religious belief that the king is Vishnu's representation on earth.

There are seven buildings in the Samutphiman quarter. They are:

- The Second Samutphiman Royal Residence: This building served as Vajiravudh's private residence. It consists of a bedchamber, a bathroom, a dressing room, and a study room.
- Royal Bathroom: The royal bathroom is in Western-style. It was furnished with facilities and items from King Vajiravudah's period and all came from Europe. The floor is Italian marble that originally had more vivid colour. However, due to recent conservation work, the colour of the marble has slightly changed. The Victorian bathtub has its own shower and the bidet has three levels of water strength. Fresh water was stored and distributed via a hexagonal concrete tank southwest of the palace. Ten wells supplied fresh water.
- Royal Dressing Room: After bathing, the king would come to his dressing room where his pages would have set out his clothes. On display in the dressing room are some of the king's clothes such as his dinner jacket, fisherman's shirt, traditional trousers, and handkerchiefs. King Vajiravudh used a different coloured handkerchief every day. Yellow was for Monday, for example, and pink for Tuesday. The handkerchiefs on display are originals and belong to Princess Bejaratana, King Vajiravudh's only child. The princess offered these items to the Marigadayavan Palace Foundation for exhibition purposes. During his reign, King Vajiravudh initiated the dressing pattern of the ladies of the courts. Women were to wear clothes according to the colour of each day, as of yellow for Monday, pink for Tuesday, green for Wednesday, orange for Thursday, blue for Friday, purple for Saturday, and red for Sunday.
- Royal Bed Chamber: The bedroom has a four-poster bed with a mosquito net covering it. Next to the bed is a cabinet that houses a Buddha in Naga Prok posture (the Buddha protected by the mythical serpent). This posture of Buddha statue is for those who were born on Saturday, which was the day King Vajiravudh was born. A candlestick was also available as night lamps during that period, if generators did not work.
- Royal Study: The display in King Vajiravuh's study is simple and straightforward. His desk and chair face to the sea, to the east. The king preferred working at night and usually retired to bed at three or four in the morning, therefore, a mosquito net would also provide cover above the desk and chair while he was working. The king preferred using sharp flat carpenter pencils when writing his plays. As for pens, he used original spring ballpoint pens with black or red ink. King Vajiravudah also preferred lined loose paper pads that he would send for binding after he finished his writings. He also kept a diary. The letter paper box with the royal monogram is made of dark purple fabric, which is the colour of Saturday – the King’s birthday. On the box there is also an embroidered Garuda (a mythical bird), an ancient symbol of Thai kings. This symbol originates from the Hindu belief that the king is the incarnation of Vishnu.
- Chao Phraya Ramaraghava Residence: To the right of the king's quarters, between the Samutphiman and Samosorn Sevakamart buildings, is the residence of Chao Phraya Ramaraghava (Mom Luang Fua Phungbun 4), King Vajiravudh's Chief Aide-de-camp and the Grand Chamberlain. His residence consists of an office area, a living room, and a bathroom. In 1925, even though King Vajiravudh had built him a house on the north side of the palace when he married, Chao Phraya Ramaraghava still stayed in these quarters most of the time. However, since the palace building is open and has many staircases, the king sometimes assigned him to guard the palace at the north and that would make him stay at his house. General/ Admiral Chao Phraya Ramaraghava was born on 5 October 1890. He was the son of Phraya Prasiddhisuphakan and Phra Nom Tad, the king's wet nurse. Chao Phraya Ramaraghava joined the king's service at the age of eighteen, and was in charge of kitchen and secretarial operations. He attained his aide-de-camp job rank as the Grand Chamberlain, Privy Council Member, Vice President of the Wild Tiger Corps, Royal Thai Army General, and Admiral of the Royal Thai Navy
- Front Court’s Dining Pavilion: Opposite Samutabhiman Royal Residence is a dining pavilion for Western cuisine. Mrigadayavan Palace has two dining pavilions: one for Western cuisine and another for Thai cuisine. During King Vajiravudh's reign, a Chinese chef was in charge of Western cuisine. On display, as in the old days, the dining table is set up in Western fashion. The chairs are British Chippendale. Dinners included several courses: hors-d'oeuvre, a fish or seafood plate, a meat plate. Red or white wine, desserts, fruits, and coffee and tea. On display is a dinner menu from 12 May 1926. King Vajiravudh usually dined around nine in the evening. White-tie, the most formal form of dressing, was his preferred choice of attire. It consists of a white stiff-fronted shirt, a white bow tie, a white low-cut waistcoat, a black tailcoat and black trousers with a single stripe of black satin.
- First Samutphiman Royal Residence: Until 1925, this had been King Vajiravud'’s private residence. When Chao Chom Suvadhana, the king's wife, was five months pregnant during the summer sojourn, the king allowed her to stay here. By doing so, King Vajiravudh abandoned the court tradition of separating the men's and ladies' quarters, as the king was so delighted with his wife's pregnancy and wanted to be close to her. The furniture in this residence - the chairs, the dressing table, the bed - once belonged to Phranang Chao Suvadhana. They were mostly purchased during her stay in England and used at Ruenrudee Palace in Bangkok. The furniture now belongs to Princess Bejaratana, the only daughter of King Vajiravudh and Phra Nang Chao Suvadhana, who lent these private items to The Mrigadayavan Palace Foundation for exhibition purposes. The circular table is partly made of walrus tusks.
- Phraya Anirudhdeva's Residence: Phraya Anirudhdeva (Mom Luang Fuen Phuengbun), the brother of Chao Phraya Ramaraghava, was one of King Vajiravudh's favourite pages. He was in charge of the administration of all pages of the court, and his specific duties included looking after the king's bedroom and his diet. As a result, his residence was close to the king's quarters. In 1925, when Chao Chom Suvadhana used the first Samutphiman quarter, Phraya Anirudhdeva's residence became bedrooms for her female attendants. Phraya Anirudhdeva then moved to the courtier's building that was close to the main building. The Foundation of Mrigadayavan Palace has restored this courtier's building and created an exhibition on the lifestyle of the royal pages and female courtiers. Similarly to Chao Phraya Ramaraghava's residence, Phraya Anirudhdeva's residence consists of a bedroom, a living room, and a bathroom. Phraya Anirudhdeva's bath is in red concrete.
- Front Court’s Bathing Pavilion: *At present the two bathing pavilions are closed for restoration. To the east of the first Samutphiman quarter, along the roofed corridor, lies the open portico to the bathing pavilion of the front (male) quarter. Mrigadayavan Palace has two bathing pavilions. The northern one was for the king and the male attendants and the southern one was for the queen and the female attendants. King Vajiravudh enjoyed sea-bathing and this activity was also good for his health. The Front Court's bathing pavilion has a private changing room and a storage room for the king's canvas deck chairs. King Vajiravudh usually sunbathed in the afternoon around five. He had a special clothing style for this activity. "His Majesty would wear a red buttonless elbow-length cotton shirt that was slit open to the chest, and belt his shirt with red cloth. As for trousers, he used mid-length red Chinese-style trousers:, said one of his royal pages. Wearing red is a common practice of Thai kings. Vajiravudh's entourage would wear white shirts with grey, brown or black sports shorts. When the king bathed in the sea, thirty to forty male attendants would surround him for his security and keep watch for jellyfish. A cross-shaped wooden pole was fixed to the roof of the front court's bathing pavilion to hoist lanterns for communicating with royal family members, the king's guests, and his entourage who resided outside the royal residential complex. For example, when the king was getting dressed for dinner, the pole would display a yellow lantern, which was the signal to those involved in the fête that evening to get ready. If the signal lantern was green, it meant that the king was performing state duties, such as giving audiences, so no one was allowed into the palace's main gates at that time.

=== Bisansagara buildings (ladies' quarters) ===
From the king's bathing pavilion, southwards along the long corridor is the Pisansakorn group of buildings, the ladies’ quarters. King Vajiravudh originally built this quarter for Queen Indrasakdisaji. No males, except the king and boys aged under twelve of the royal family, were allowed to stay in this quarter.

It was a royal court tradition to have female security officers in the ladies' court, known as klon or 'court police'. Small balconies in the corridor at the inner court were used as guard posts for the klon and working spaces for ladies of the court.

- Living Room: The first room to the right is the living room. It was once the audience chamber of the ladies' quarter. At present this room is used as a classroom for Thai classical music lessons. The living room stores and displays various types of classical Thai instruments with the most significant of all is the ranad, a Thai xylophone. This ranad - which is covered with purple cloth - belongs to Princess Maha Chakri Sirindhorn, the daughter of the current monarch. The princess played it with the border patrol police classical music ensemble in the 1990s when she visited the palace. There are also paper-mâché masks of classical music teachers ensconced on gold-leaf tiered tables.
- Inner Court Dining Hall: Turning left and down the corridor is the palace's second dining hall on the right. King Vajiravudh regularly had lunch in the ladies' quarters. This dining hall served traditional Siamese cuisine, eaten in the traditional manner. The king would dress casually in a white loose-fitting Chinese jacket with a squirrel-tail-design pantaloon. He would be seated on the carpet and would eat in the Thai fashion with his hands. Food was cooked and prepared in the main kitchen on the west side of the palace. A food officer would taste all dishes before they were brought to the dining room. Dishes that had good taste and were poison-free would be transferred onto silver pedestal trays. They would then be placed inside gold-embroidered silk bags. The bags would be tied with cotton strings and a clay seal would cover the ends of strings. When ready, lady courtiers would carry them to the dining room and the seals would be broken in front of the king. Traditional Thai meals consist of a fried dish, a curry dish, a steamed dish, and clear soup, with dips and condiments. All dishes are served in three separate bowls for sharing, and they would be arranged in a half circle with a main dish in the centre. After the main courses, King Vajiravudh would wash his hands with lavender soap flakes. A lady courtier would then serve desserts, consisting of peeled seasonal fruits, traditional Thai sweets, or fruits in syrup or coconut milk.
- Pisansakorn Royal Residence: Beyond the second dining room is the Pisansakorn royal residence. King Vijiravudh originally had this building for Queen Indrasakdisaji (née Praphai Sujaritkul), who was a daughter of Chao Phraya Suthammamontri and Thanphuying Kimlai. She was married to King Vajiravudh in 1921, and was titled "Somdech Phranang Chao Indrasakdisaji", the 'royal consort'. When she became pregnant, she was given the highest title as the queen. Queen Indrasakdisaji later suffered two miscarriages and resumed her rank as royal consort. Her residence consists of a living room, a bedroom, a dressing room, and a bathroom with a private balcony facing the sea. Periodic exhibitions display one of her dresses in this residence. It shows that the ladies back in those days preferred to wear long strands of pearls and wrap-around sarongs.
- Phra Sujaritsuda’s Residence: The palace's southernmost residence was for Phra Sujaritsuda, an elder sister of Queen Indrasakdisaji. Phra Sujaritsuda was also King Vajiravudh's royal concubine. Her residence consists of a bedroom, a dressing room, a bathroom, and a private balcony.
- Khun Thao Vorakhananan's residence: Khun Thao Vorakhananan (Mom Rajawongse Pum Malakul) and Khun Thao Somsak (Mom Rajawongse Poom Malakul) were household managers of the ladies’ quarter.

== Projects ==
From the Ladies' Court, gardening areas can be seen on both sides. These are part of Mrigadayavan's garden and ground restoration project to commemorate King Vajiravudh's distinct activities and his support for Thai literature. The project aims to develop the landscape of the palace that will meet requirements for the forest and animal protection scheme of 1924. This 1924 Government Gazette states that 2,200 rai of palace ground be conserved. Design of the gardens and their plants involve references from King Vajiravudh's literary works such as Sakuntala, Mattanabhata, Benjanaridham, and Venice Vanich.

=== King Vajiravudh's passion for music ===
King Vajiravudh was a poet and understood the importance of music to his people. In keeping with the king's vision, the Marigadayavan Palace Foundation has set up a Thai youth ensemble and a Thai Classical Music Scholarship Program (TCMSP). TCMSP provides free Thai classical music lessons to the children of border patrol police who serve in the Rama VI camp and the adjacent Naresuan Camps as well as children of The Mrigadayavan Palace Foundation employees. The program invites well-known musicians to teach on weekends. Prominent figures are Mr Sirichaichan Fakchumrun, former director of the Fine Arts Department and acclaimed National Artist in classical Thai music, teachers from the Plainern Palace, a palace associated with Thai classical music teaching, and teachers from Phetchaburi's Ladies Ensemble. The lessons include traditional Thai classical music and the compositions of King Vajiravudh and his contemporaries.

=== King Bhumibol's vetiver grass project ===
In preparing the soil for the gardens, vetiver grass was planted to stabilise the soil and organic fertilisers are used to support the plants. Since the soil condition at Mrigadayavan Palace is both sandy and permeable, and the deeper soil is also hard and compact, it is not suitable for gardening. The Foundation of Mrigadayavan Palace has been working closely with the Phetchaburi Huay Sai Royal Development Project and the Phetchaburi Soil Development Unit to revitalize the soil. One solution is to plant vetiver that will loosen the soil and enable plant growth. King Bhumibol Adulyadej, or King Rama IX, initiated the use of vetiver to harmonize the soil. He stated in a speech on 22 June 1991 that vetiver was sturdy, had long roots and could grow in a net-like shape that could pierce the ground. The grass would also serve as natural walls in holding water, while protecting the fertile soil from crumbling and being a natural shield against weeds. Mrigadayavan Palace's soil development project also uses organic fertilizers in ploughing fresh vegetation into the fields, which will increase soil richness. After ploughing, the ground are cultivated with plants such as green beans and striped Crotalaria.

Apart from having garden development project, The Foundation of Mrigadayavan Palace also uses its produce from the gardens in exhibitions, including flower arrangement demonstrations, perfume making, and traditional food decoration. Plants grown in the palace gardens are flowers such as jasmine, crown flower, bachelor's button, and herbs. The Foundation of Mrigadayavan Palace hopes that the garden area could serve as a cultural learning centre about local flora and court customs and traditions.
