= Faculty of Dentistry, Chulalongkorn University =

Dental school in Thailand

Coordinates: 13.743226°N 100.534675°E

- คณะทันตแพทยศาสตร์ จุฬาลงกรณ์มหาวิทยาลัย
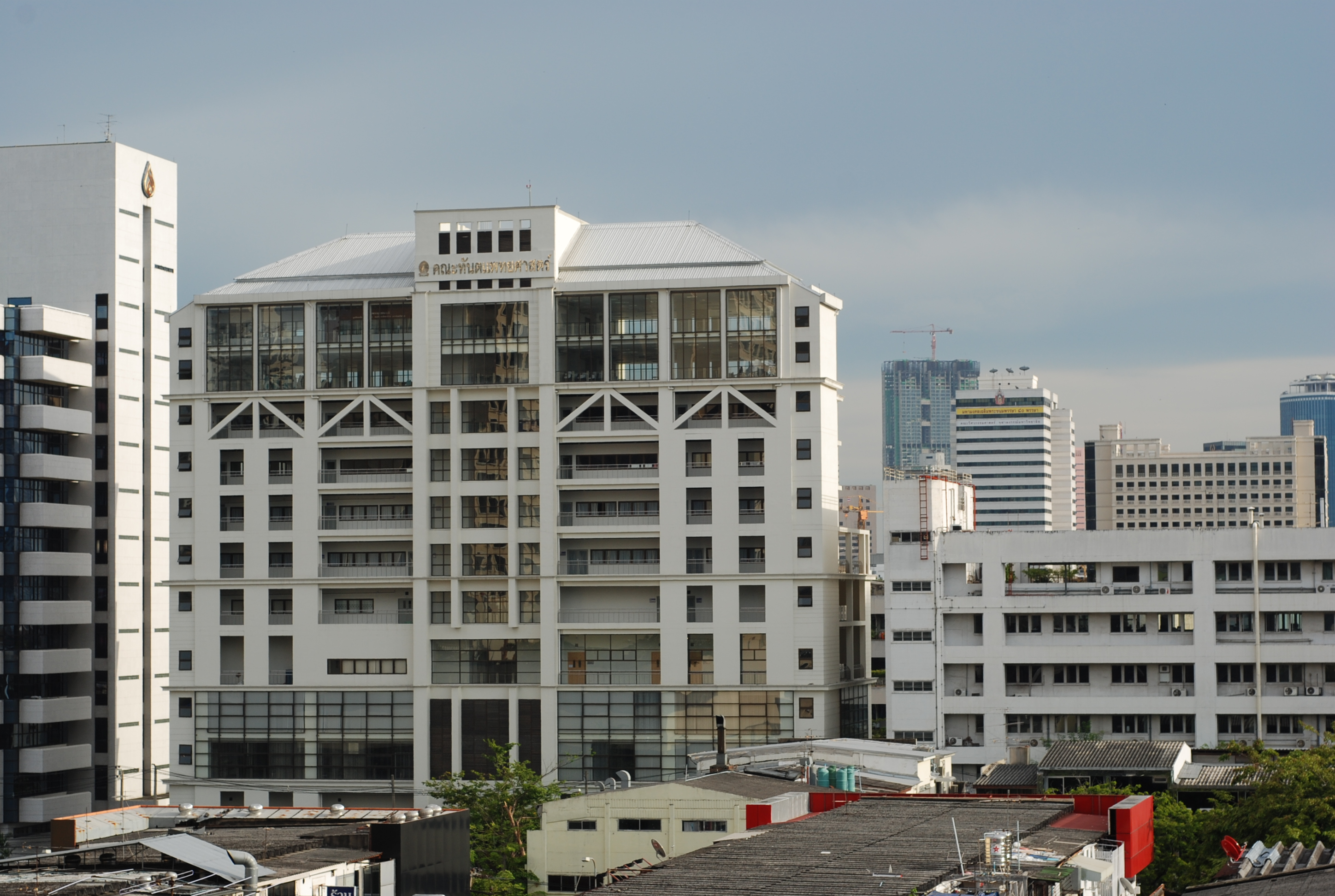
- Faculty of Dentistry, Chulalongkorn University
- Established: May 16, 1940
- Parent institution: Chulalongkorn University
- Dean: Professor Pornchai Jansisyanont
- Undergraduates: Accept around 65 students per year (Year 2024)
- Website: www.dent.chula.ac.th

The Faculty of Dentistry, Chulalongkorn University, the first dental school in Thailand, was established in 1940. The school accepts about 65 undergraduate dental students per year (2024). In the QS World University Rankings by Subject 2024. Faculty of Dentistry, Chulalongkorn University, is ranked No. 1 among Thai Universities and World's Top 60. It's ranking has risen significantly in the last years, reaching the 32nd place globally in 2026. The Faculty offers undergraduate degree in Dentistry and a large array of postgraduate courses, Specialist Training and Research degrees. The Faculty offers programmes in Thai and English and in 2025 launched an international Masters Programme in Implants and Esthetic Restorative Dentistry (CUIE) in English.

== Departments ==
- Department of Anatomy
- Department of Biochemistry
- Department of Community Dentistry
- Department of Microbiology
- Department of Occlusion
- Department of Oral and Maxillofacial Surgery
- Department of Oral Pathology
- Department of Operative Dentistry
- Department of Oral Medicine
- Department of Orthodontics
- Department of Periodontology
- Department of Prosthodontics
- Department of Pediatric Dentistry
- Department of Pharmacology
- Department of Physiology
- Department of Radiology

== Hospital and Other Units ==
- Congenital Deformity Reconstruction
- Dental Services
- Esthetics
- Geriatric Dental
- Infectious Dental
- In Patient Ward
- Implantology
- Maxillofacial Reconstruction
- Post-Graduated
- Special Dental
- Dental IT Center
- Dental Material Sciences Research Center
- Oral biology Research Center

== Major teaching affiliate ==
- Faculty of Dentistry, Chulalongkorn University Hospital, Bangkok

== Address ==
- 34 Henri-Duant Rd, Pathumwan, Bangkok 10330, Thailand

== See also ==
- List of Dental Schools in Thailand
