= Neilson Hays Library =

English-language library in Bangkok, Thailand

Coordinates: 13°43′38″N 100°31′23″E

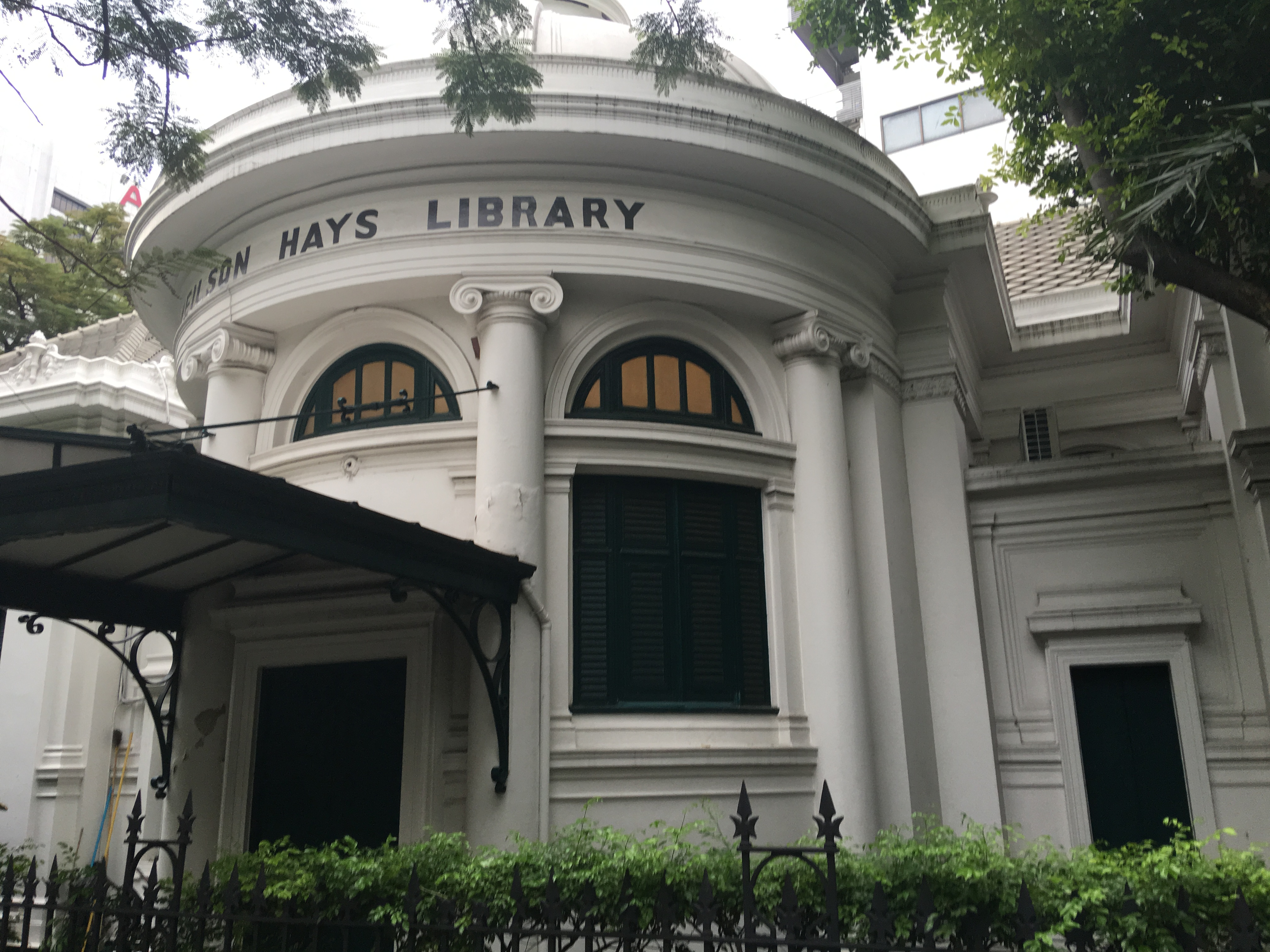
The building in 2016

The Neilson Hays Library is a privately funded English-language library in Bangkok, Thailand. It occupies a historic building on Surawong Road in Bangkok's Bang Rak district, designed in neoclassical style by Italian architects Mario Tamagno and Giovanni Ferrero. The library traces its origins to the Bangkok Ladies' Library Association, which was established in 1869 but did not have a permanent location until the current building was commissioned in 1921 by resident American doctor T. Heyward Hays in memory of his late wife, Jennie Neilson Hays, who had been an active member of the library board. The building, completed in 1922, features a symmetrical plan, with a domed rotunda originally serving as the entrance hall (now a gallery) and an H-shaped reading room. The building received the ASA Architectural Conservation Award in 1982 and was registered as an ancient monument in 2001. It underwent major restoration work from 2016 to 2018.

== History ==
The Neilson Hays library was named after Jennie Neilson Hays, a Danish-American missionary who came to Bangkok in the late 19th century. She was married to a medical doctor, Thomas Hayward Hays, who was also a missionary. Jennie joined the Bangkok Library Association in 1895 and was its president three times in 25 years, until her death in 1920.

After Jennie's death, Thomas Hays commissioned Mario Tamagno, an architect from Turin, Italy, to design the library. Other buildings that Tamagno contributed to include the Ananta Samakhom Throne Hall, Phaya Thai Palace, and the Hua Lamphong railway station.

== Awards ==
The Neilson Hays library won the ASA Architectural Conservation Award from the Association of Siamese Architects in 1982. It also was conferred ancient monument status by the Thai Fine Arts Department in 2001.
