= Carlo Allegri =

Italian engineer who worked extensively in Siam

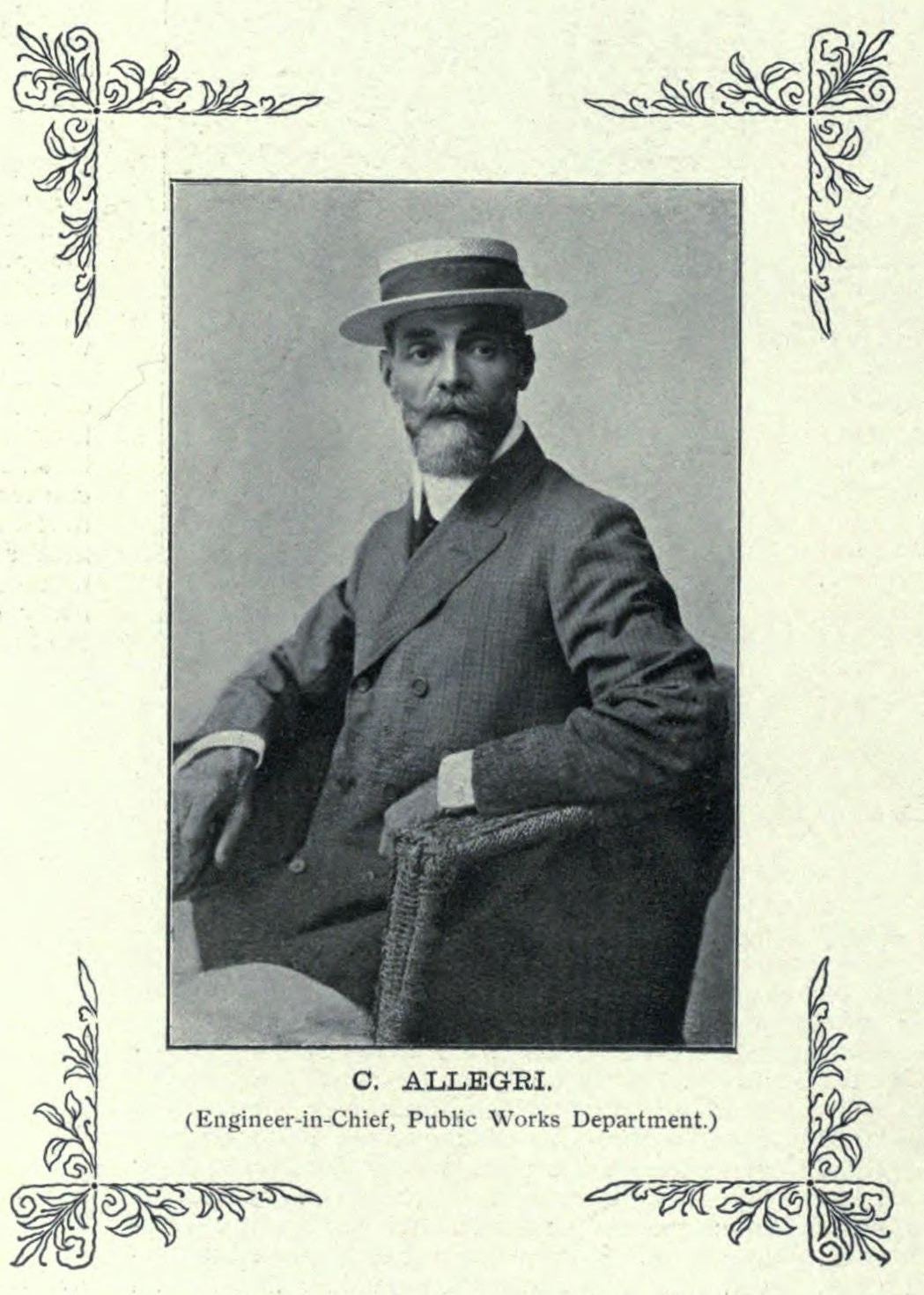
- Born: 1862; Milan, Italy
- Died: 1938 (aged 75–76); Milan, Italy
- Occupation: Architect
- Buildings: Ananta Samakhom Throne Hall, Phan Fa Lilat Bridge, and King Chulalongkorn Memorial Hospital

Carlo Allegri (1862–1938) was an Italian engineer who worked extensively in Siam (Thailand) during the turn of the 19th–20th centuries. He served under the government of King Chulalongkorn (Rama V) for over 20 years, where he held the position of Engineer-in-Chief of the Public Works Department. He oversaw the construction of numerous roads and bridges in the country and contributed to buildings such as the Ananta Samakhom Throne Hall.

== Early life ==
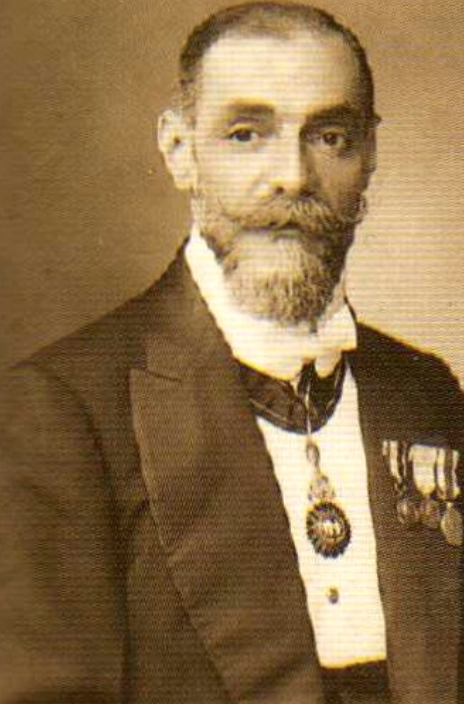

In 1889, he left university and went to Thailand to work for the Grassi Brothers, a foreign construction company in Siam. Later, the Thai government hired Allegri to help build palaces and other structures, making him the first foreign engineer to work in the Thai construction industry. In 1893, he became the chief engineer for the Ministry of Public Works and promptly hired 35 Italian staff members.

== Career ==
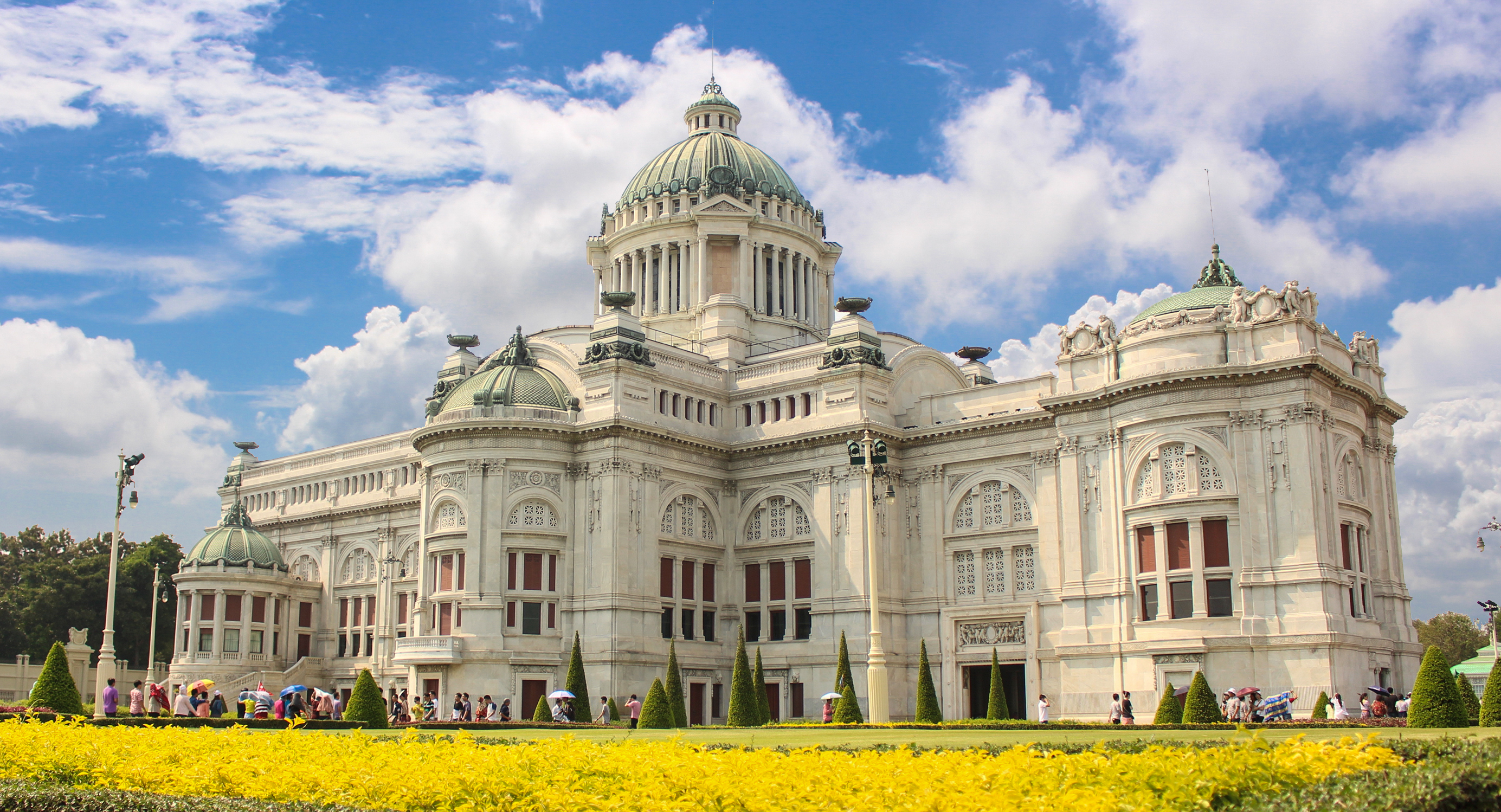
Ananta Samakhom Throne Hall, completed in 1915

Allegri was assigned by the Thai government to modify the palace. During renovations, Allegri had to overcome numerous construction issues. For example, he initially chose brick for the foundation of the building without realizing it was not strong enough. Allegri partnered with Annibale Rigotti and Mario Tamagno who both graduated from the Accademia Albertina in 1890. Allegri was not formerly educated in the same way as his partners, but had learned some engineering knowledge and experience from his family business. His family was known for bridge construction in Italy, and the Thai government knew that Allegri and his partners were able to construct the bridge. This is why they permitted to build many bridges in Thailand. In 1905, he and his partner wanted to build a bridge that was made from iron. In 1907, he and his friends had designed Villa Norasingh that had a feeling of “Venice of the East” and they built a huge palace for King Rama V called the Ananta Samakhom Throne Hall. Allegri built many buildings and structures and contributed to buildings such as, Phan Fa Li Lat Bridge (1905), Red cross hospital (1900), Paruskavan Palace (1903–1905), and Phan Phiphop Lila Bridge (1904).

== Personal life ==
Having played a prominent role in Thailand during the time of King Rama V’s renovation of Siam (Thailand), Allegri retired and returned to Italy after the completion of the Ananta Samakhom Throne Hall. In 1938, he died in Italy at the age of 76.
