= Phitsanulok Mansion =

- บ้านพิษณุโลก

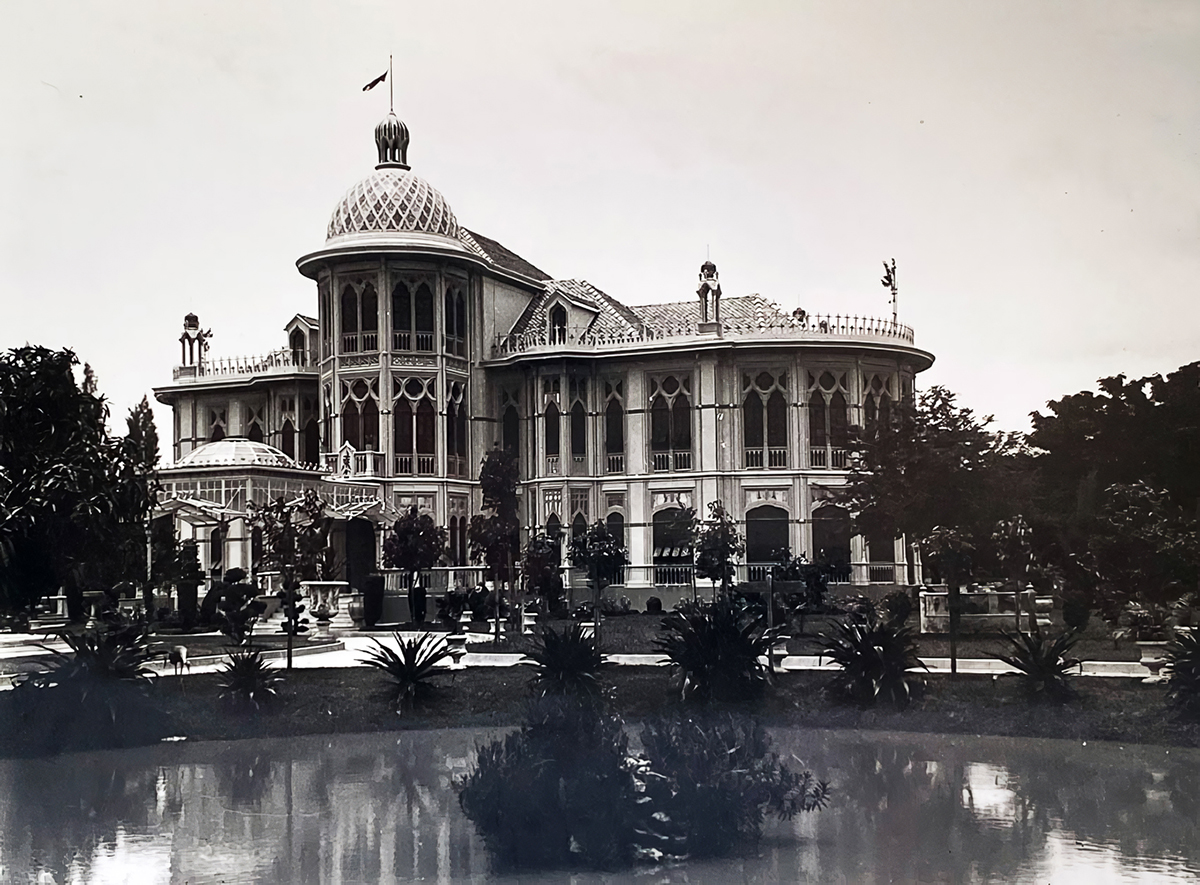
- Phitsanulok Mansion c1930
- Interactive map of the Phitsanulok Mansion area

General information
- Architectural style: Venetian Gothic
- Location: 428 Phitsanulok Road Dusit District 10300, Bangkok, Thailand
- Coordinates: 13.75849°N 100.51814°E
- Current tenants: Prime Minister of Thailand
- Completed: 1922
- Owner: Government of Thailand

Technical details
- Grounds: 40,000 m^{2} (9.9 acres)

Design and construction
- Architect: Mario Tamagno

Phitsanulok Mansion (Thai: บ้านพิษณุโลก) or formerly known Banthomsinth House (Thai: บ้านบรรทมสินธุ์ lit: House of the Sleeping Narayana) is the official residence of the Prime Minister of Thailand, located not far to the east from the government house in Dusit, Bangkok. The mansion was originally built at the behest of King Rama VI and was given to his aide-de-camp, Phraya Aniruth-deva.

== History ==
The high cost of maintenance forced Lord Aniruth-deva to offer the mansion to King Rama VII, which he refused. During the Second World War, the Japanese government wanted to buy the mansion and use it as an embassy. However, because the mansion is located in such an important strategic area, the Thai government decided to buy the mansion and use it as a state guest house instead. Later it was decided that it should become an official residence of the Prime Minister of Thailand. The Prime minister works nearby at the Government House. The mansion is maintained by the Office of the Prime Minister, a government agency of the Royal Thai Government.

Only two prime ministers, Prem Tinsulanonda and Chuan Leekpai, have taken residence there. Prem moved to another premises after a few days. The house is reportedly haunted.

== Gallery ==
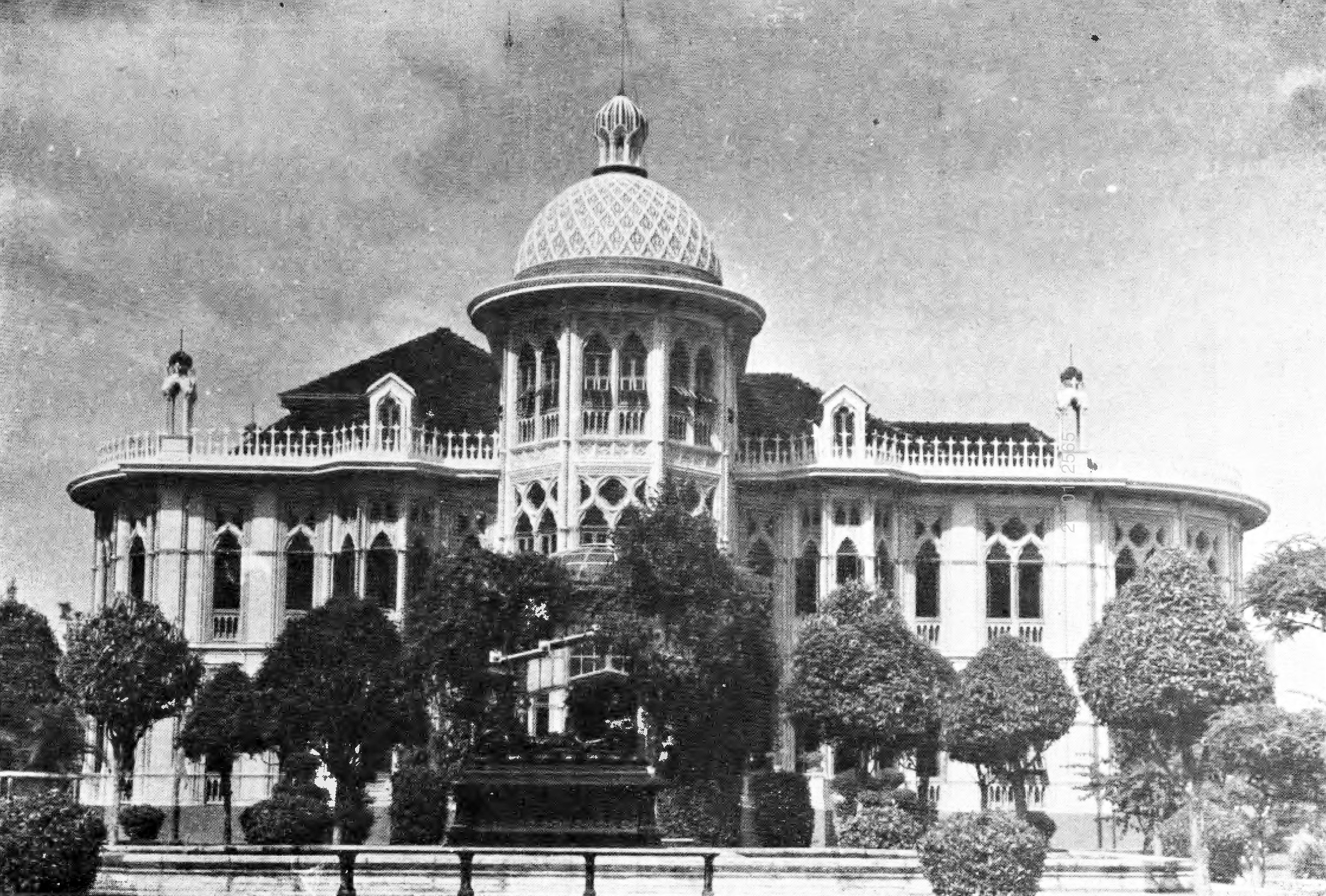
Phitsanulok Mansion in 1943

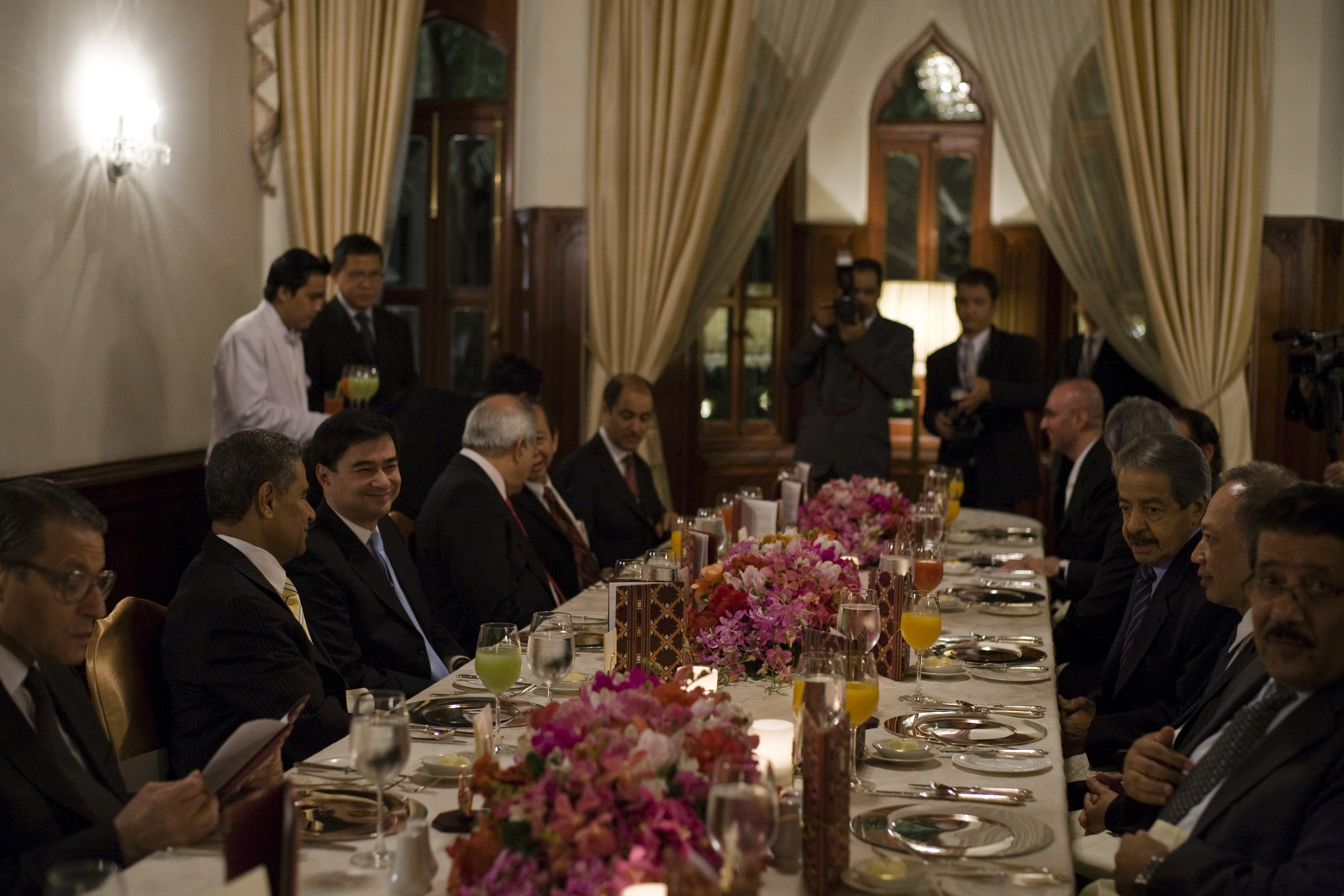
Dining room

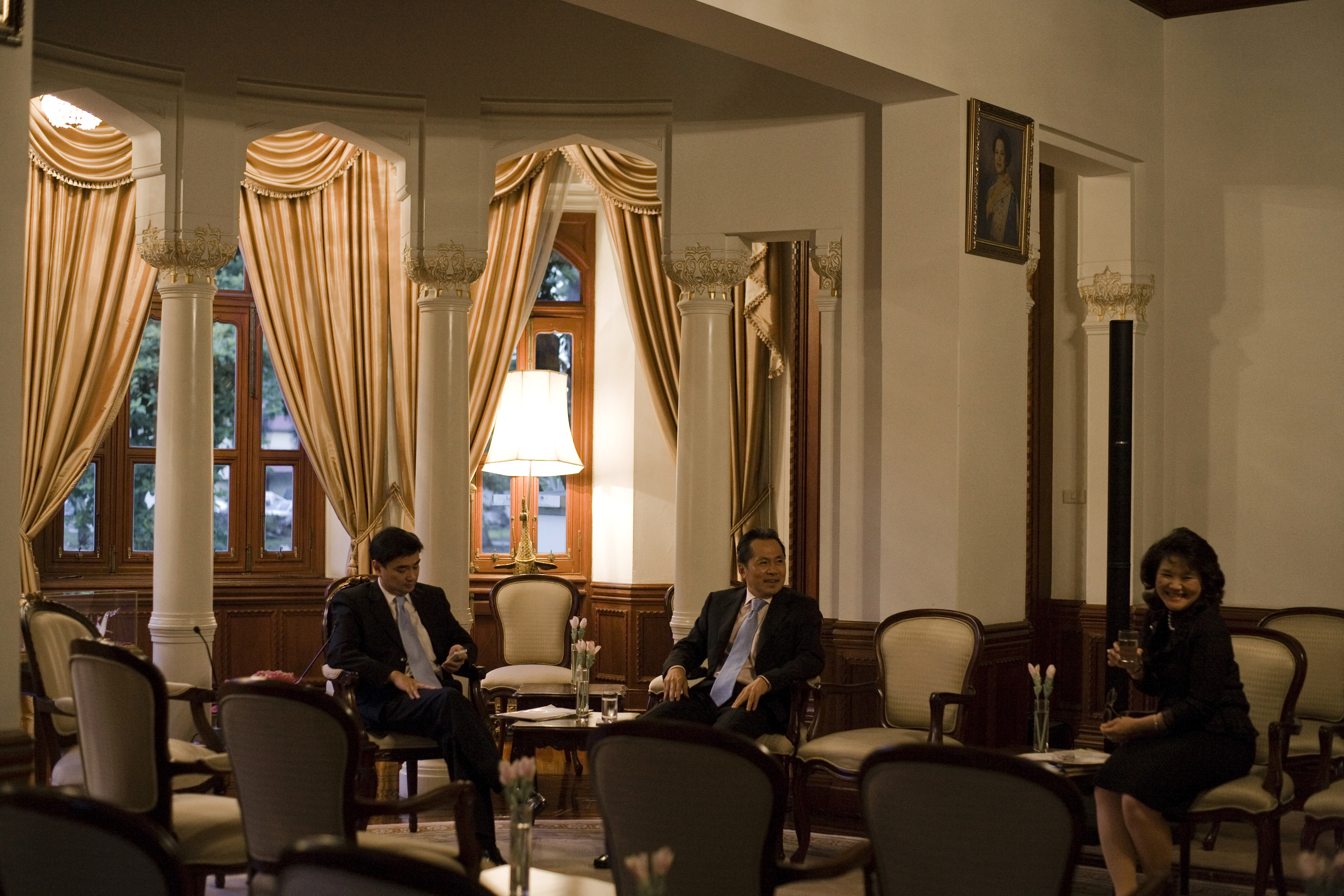
Reception room

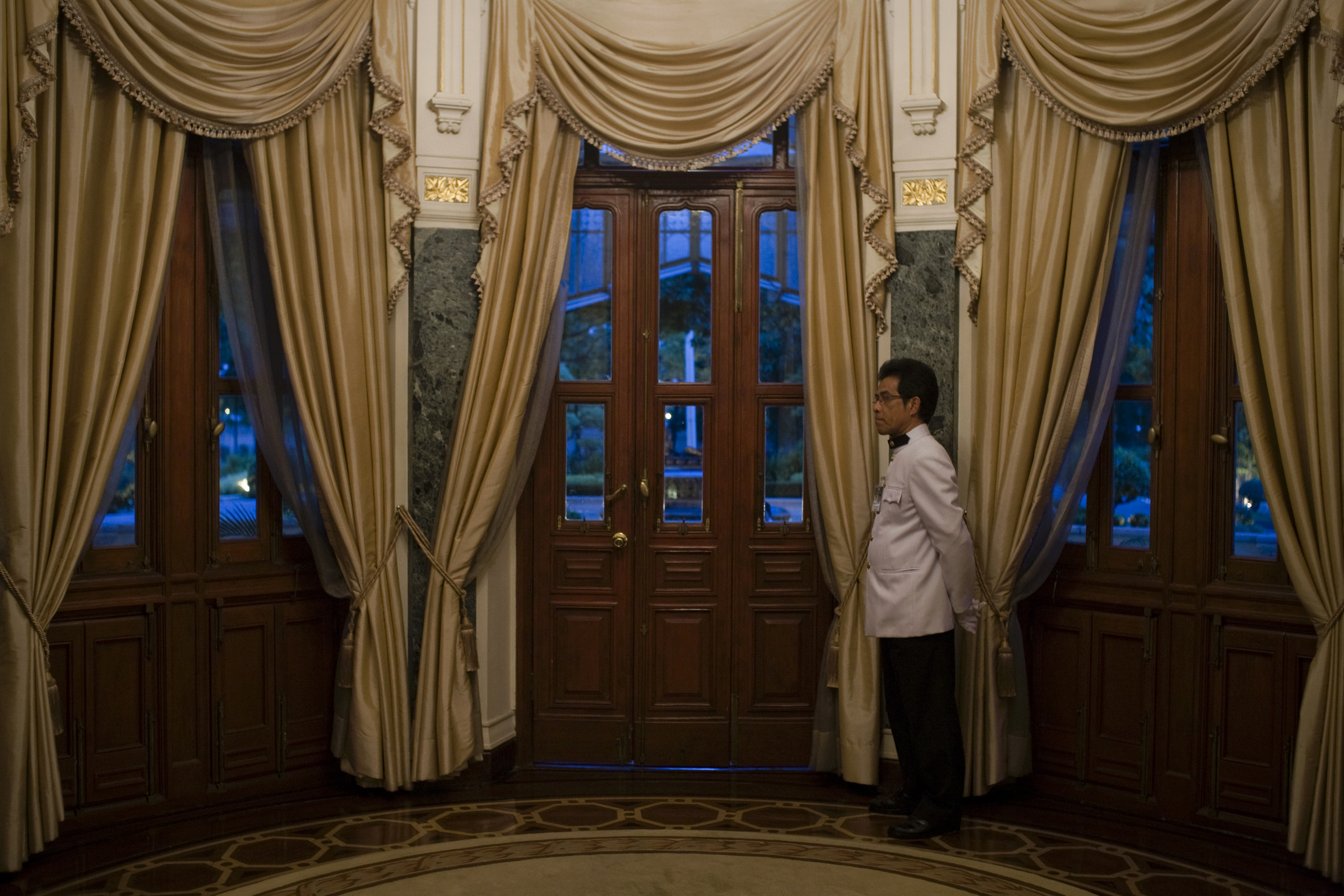
Inside the mansion

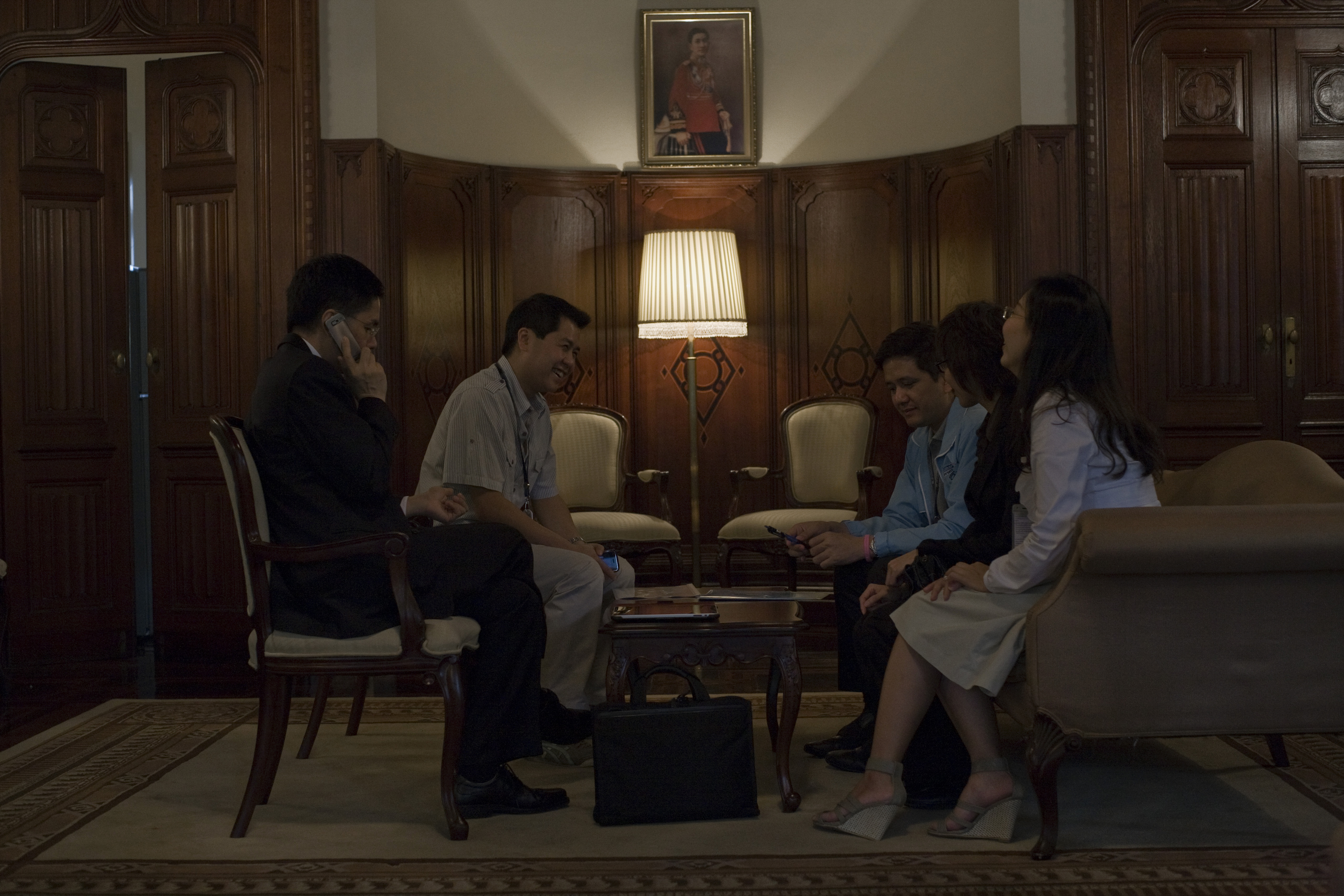
Lobby

== See also ==
- Government House (Thailand)
- Mario Tamagno
- Official residence
