= Hua Lamphong railway station =

Former central station in Bangkok, Thailand

Bangkok (Hua Lamphong) กรุงเทพ (หัวลำโพง)
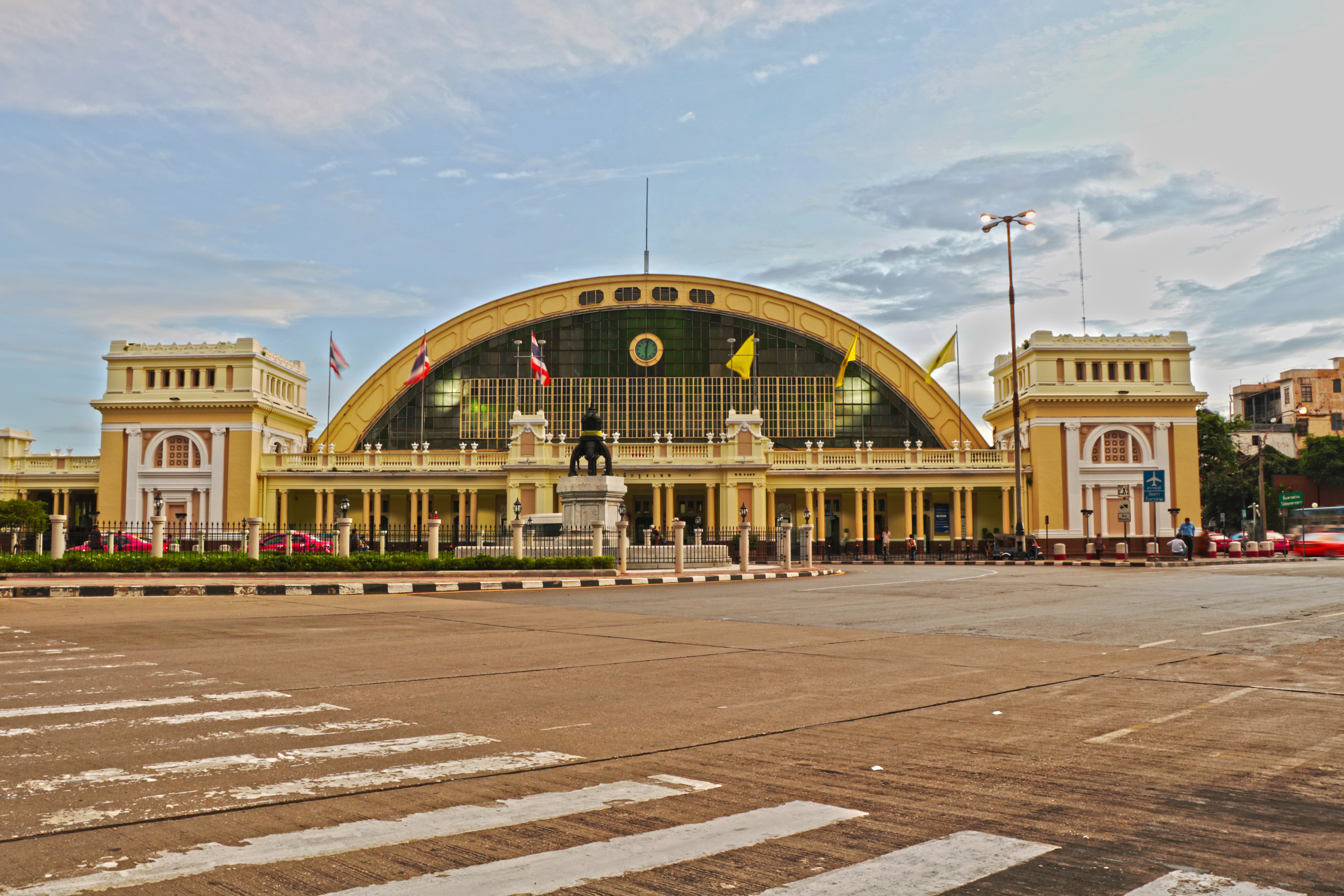

General information
- Location: Rama IV Rd, Rong Mueang, Pathum Wan, Bangkok; Central Region; Thailand
- Coordinates: 13°44′20″N 100°31′0″E
- Operator: State Railway of Thailand
- Manager: Ministry of Transport
- Platforms: 14
- Tracks: 14
- Connections: Hua Lamphong; BMTA Bus; Khlong Phadung Krung Kasem boat service Taxi / Motorcycle taxi

Construction
- Structure type: Concrete building
- Parking: Yes
- Cycle facilities: Yes
- Architect: Mario Tamagno and Annibale Rigotti
- Architectural style: Italian neo-renaissance

Other information
- Status: Current terminus for ordinary trains, commuter trains, excursion trains, and Eastern line trains Future station for SRT Dark Red Line
- Station code: กท.

History
- Opened: 25 June 1916; 110 years ago
- Former names: Bangkok

Passengers
- 60,000+ per day

Services
Preceding station	State Railway of Thailand	Following station
Terminus	Northern Line	Yommarat Halt towards Chiang Mai
Terminus	Northeastern Line	Yommarat Halt towards Ubon Ratchathani or Khamsavath (Laos)
Terminus	Southern Line	Yommarat Halt towards Su-ngai Kolok
Terminus	Eastern Line	Urupong Halt towards Chuk Samet or Poipet (Cambodia)
Location

Bangkok (Hua Lamphong) railway station (Thai: สถานีกรุงเทพ (หัวลำโพง), RTGS: Sathani Krung Thep (Hua Lamphong)) is a railway station in Pathum Wan, the former central passenger terminal in Bangkok and the former railway hub of Thailand. It is in the center of the city in the Pathum Wan district, and is operated by the State Railway of Thailand (SRT). Long distance trains moved to the new central station at Krung Thep Aphiwat Central Terminal in 2023.

== Naming ==
The station was officially referred to by the State Railway of Thailand as Bangkok railway station or Sathani Rotfai Krung Thep (สถานีรถไฟกรุงเทพ) in Thai. Hua Lamphong (Thai: หัวลำโพง) was originally the informal name of the station, used by locals, tourist guides and the public press. In all documents published by the State Railway of Thailand (such as train tickets, timetables, and tour pamphlets) the station is uniformly transcribed as Krungthep (กรุงเทพ) in Thai. As of 19 January 2023, following the opening of Krung Thep Aphiwat Central Terminal, the station was officially renamed Bangkok (Hua Lamphong) railway station.

The name Hua Lamphong is the name of both a canal and a road (now filled as Rama IV Road) that used to pass near this station. The name Hua Lamphong, some say originated from the green plains surrounding the area in the past that were used to graze the cattle of the Muslim community, when the people saw the cattle running vigorously in the plains, it was named the Thung Wua Lamphong ('swaggering bulls plains'), eventually being called Hua Lamphong. Others presumed that the name originated from a species of plant called Lamphong (Datura metel), a toxic plant that used to grow abundantly in the area.

It is also thought that the name may have a Malay origin as a mixture of khua in Thai, meaning 'bridge', and the word lampung in Malay (pronounced lumpung) meaning 'to float'. Loi Khua Lumphung, thus meaning a temporary bridge (across or floating on the river) then become known as Hua Lamphong by Thais.

Hua Lamphong railway station actually was a name of another railway station of private Paknam Railway Line which operated before the founding of the Royal State Railways of Siam (SRS—now the State Railway of Thailand). Hua Lamphong railway station was opposite the present-day Bangkok railway station. It opened in 1893 and closed in 1960 in conjunction with the dissolution of the Paknam Railway Line. The site of the demolished Hua Lamphong railway station borders Rama IV Road. Today, Hua Lamphong MRT station lies beneath it.

== History ==
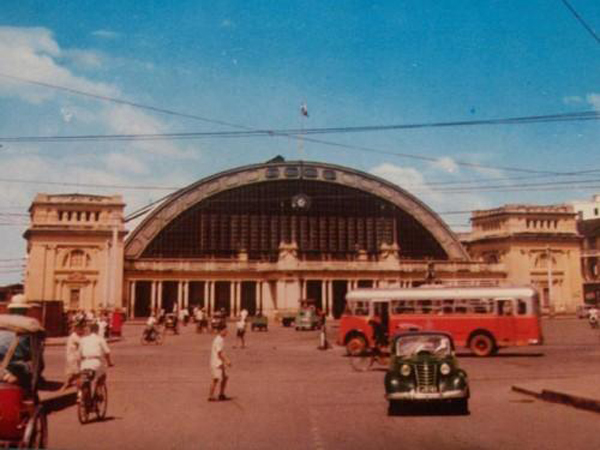
Bangkok railway station before 1970

The station was opened on 25 June 1916 after six years of construction that started in 1910 in the reign of King Chulalongkorn and finished in the reign of King Vajiravudh. The site of the railway station was previously occupied by the national railway's maintenance centre, which moved to Makkasan in June 1910. At the nearby site of the previous railway station a pillar commemorates the inauguration of the Thai railway network in 1897.

The station was built in an Italian Neo-Renaissance-style, with decorated wooden roofs and stained glass windows. It is disputed whether the design of the station was inspired by Frankfurt (Main) Hauptbahnhof in Germany or Torino Porta Nuova railway station in Italy, as a prototype. The front of the building was designed by Turin-born Mario Tamagno, who with countryman Annibale Rigotti (1870–1968) was also responsible for the design of several other early 20th century public buildings in Bangkok. The pair designed Bang Khun Phrom Palace (1906), Ananta Samakhom Throne Hall in the Royal Plaza (1907–1915) and Suan Kularb Residential Hall and Throne Hall in Dusit Garden, among other buildings.

Initially, Hua Lamphong was a combined railway station: it transported goods and people. Over time, the transport of freight and passengers proved untenable due to the limited area for expansion of the 120 rais (48 acres) site. The transport of goods was shifted to the Phahonyothin freight yard in 1960.

During World War II and the Bombing of Bangkok, a large air raid shelter was erected in front of the railway station. This was demolished after the war and replaced by a fountain of Erawan which still stands today.

The station is an air-conditioned two-storey building consisting of two main entrances, 14 platforms, 22 ticket counters, and two electric display boards, with one mega television screen. Above two entrances to the platforms are the large pictures showing King Chulalongkorn and Queen Saovabha Phongsri inaugurated the first inter-city Bangkok-Ayutthaya rail service on 26 March 1896, the first railway line in Thailand and the beginning of Thai railways. In the booming railway travel era, a right part of the station building used to be 10-rooms for who wants to stay overnight in the form of transit hotel named "Rajdhani Hotel" (โรงแรมราชธานี), it was in operation between 1927 and 1969.

On 8 November 1986, six runaway, unmanned, coupled locomotives which had their engines left on due to maintenance works at Bang Sue Depot collided at Bangkok railway station, killing four and injuring four.

Prior to 2020, Hua Lamphong served about 200 trains and approximately 60,000 passengers each day. Since 2004 the station has been connected by an underground passage to the MRT (Metropolitan Rapid Transit) subway system's Hua Lamphong MRT Station. The station is also a terminus of the Eastern & Oriental Express luxury train, and the International Express to Malaysia.

On 25 June 2019, the 103rd anniversary of Hua Lamphong was celebrated with a Google Doodle.

=== Closure to long distance trains ===
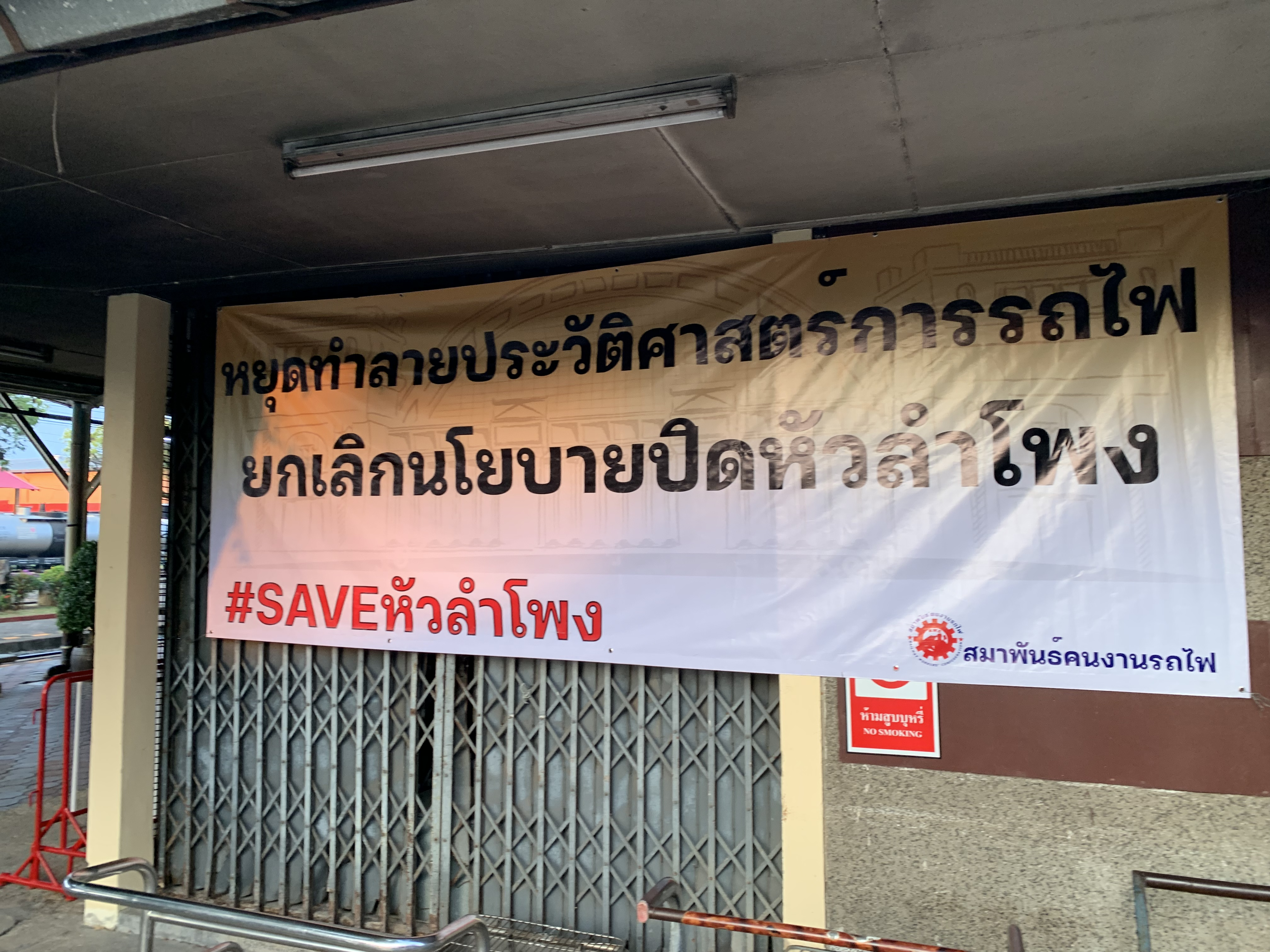
A sign protesting the station closure reads ""Stop destroying [Thai] rail history. Cancel the closure of Hua Lamphong [station]. #SAVE Hua Lamphong" at Nakhon Lampang station

The station was scheduled to be closed as a railway station in 2021, when it would have been converted into a museum. The move to Bangkok's central station to Krung Thep Aphiwat Central Terminal was planned as soon as the SRT Dark Red Line services were opened but it was delayed due to opposition.

On 19 January 2023, all long distance trains were moved to terminate at Krung Thep Aphiwat. Currently only ordinary and commuter trains (calling at all stops) operate on the Northern, Northeastern and Southern lines, while all Eastern line services terminate here.

=== Future ===
Hua Lamphong will be a future station on the SRT Dark Red Line southern extension, before crossing the Chao Phraya River to replace the route of the current Maeklong Railway.

== Gallery ==
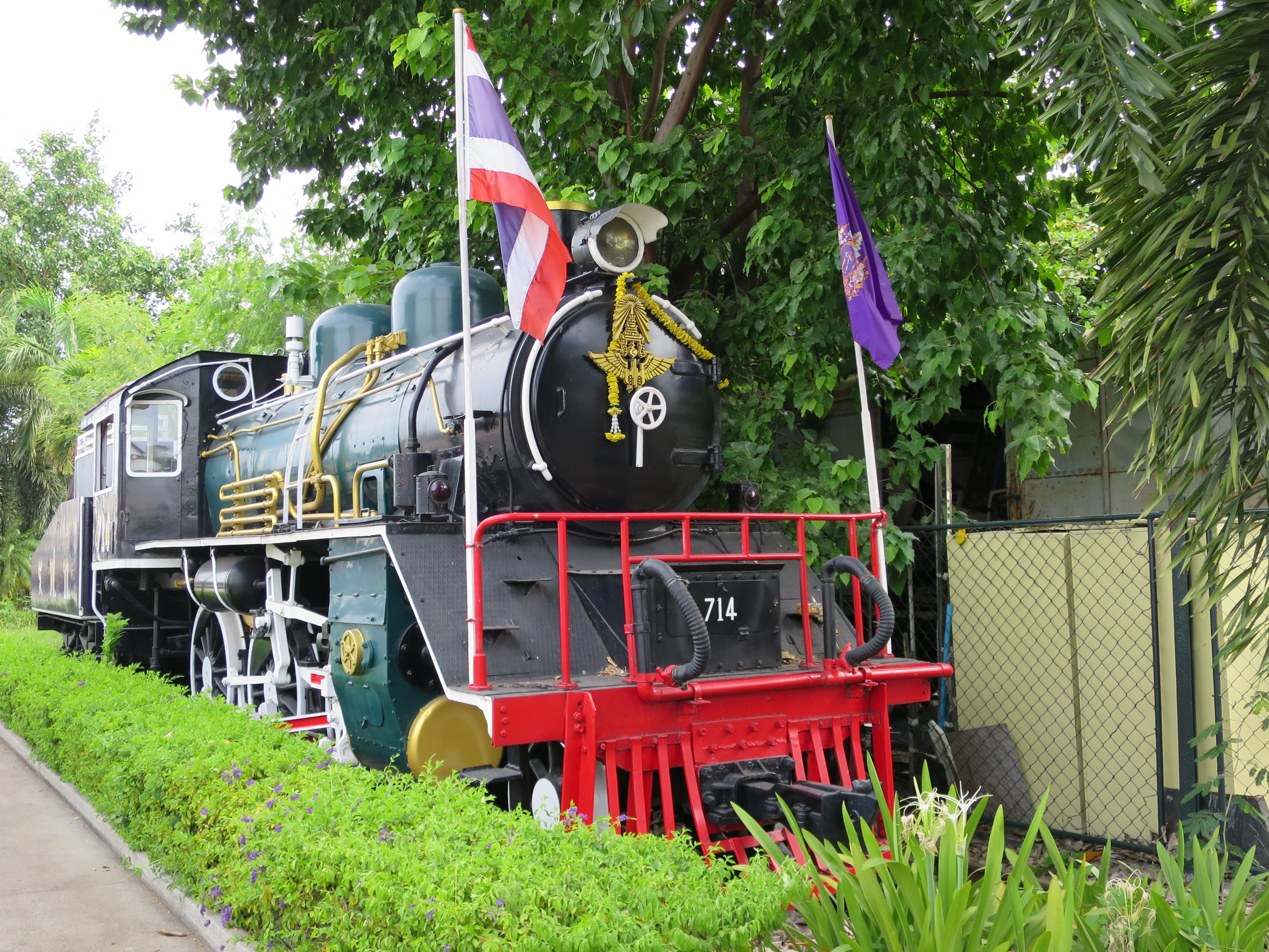
JNR Class C56 16 (SRT 714) Preserved in the Bangkok Railway Station

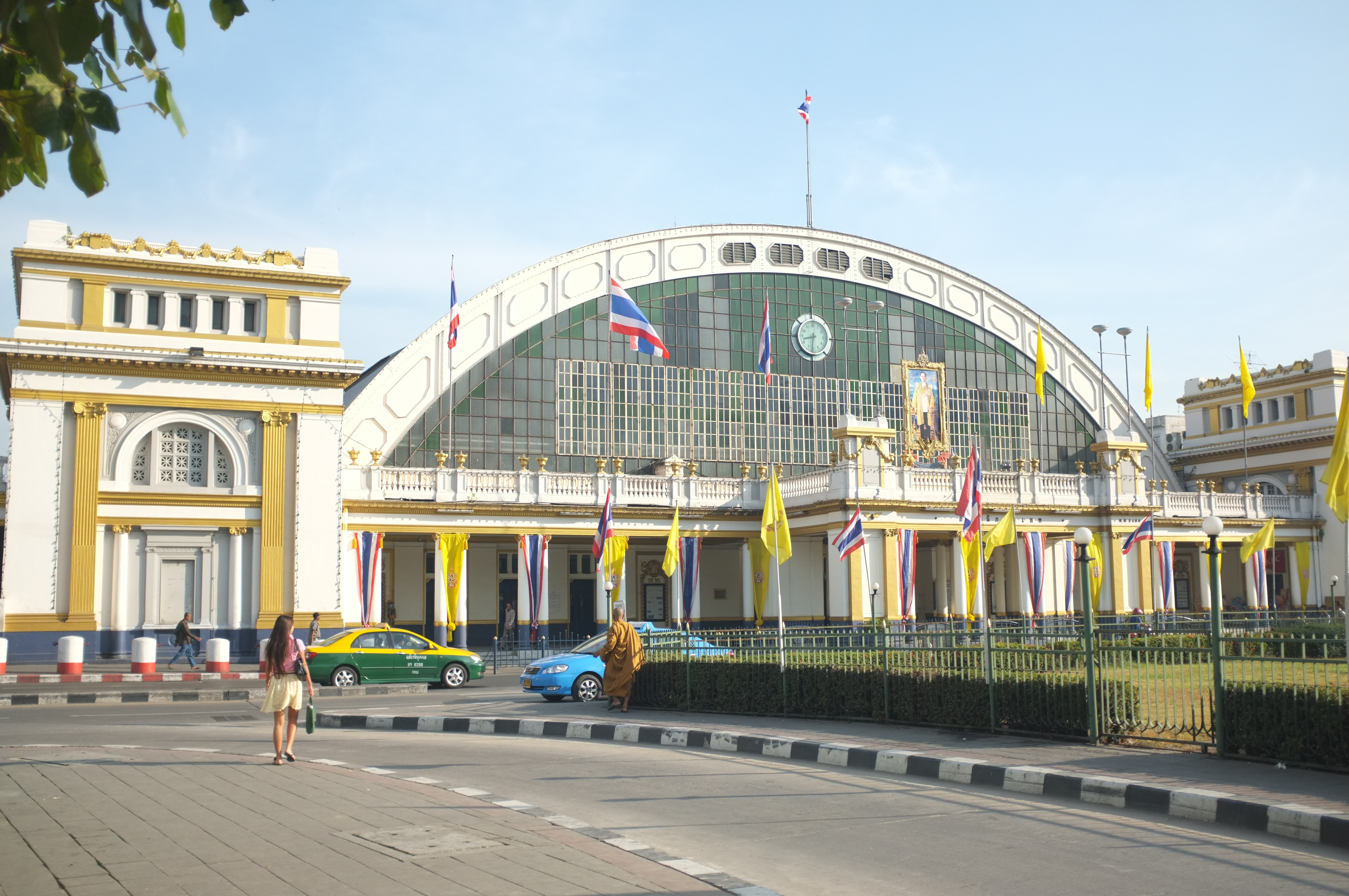
The main façade of the station

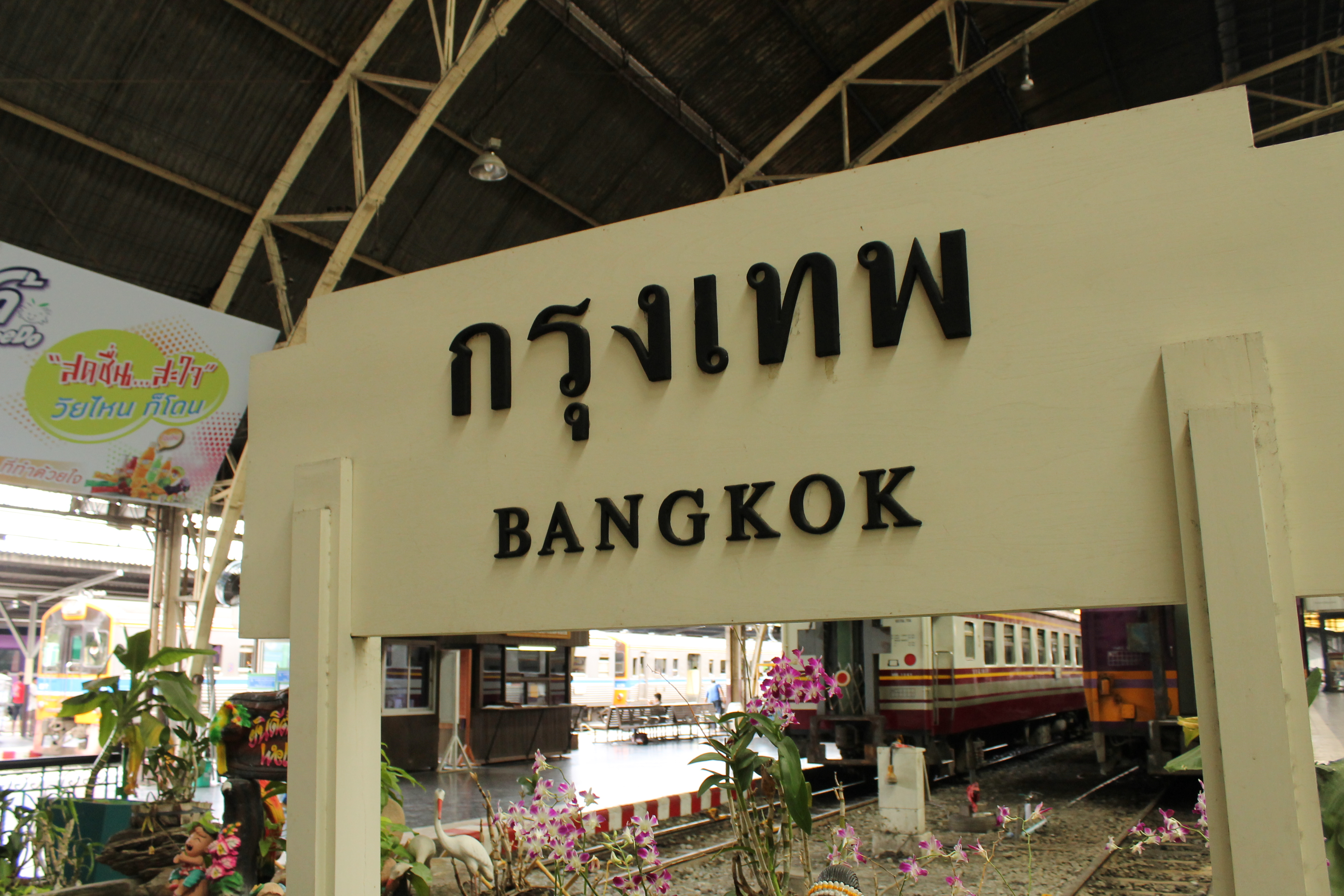
Station sign, Hua Lamphong

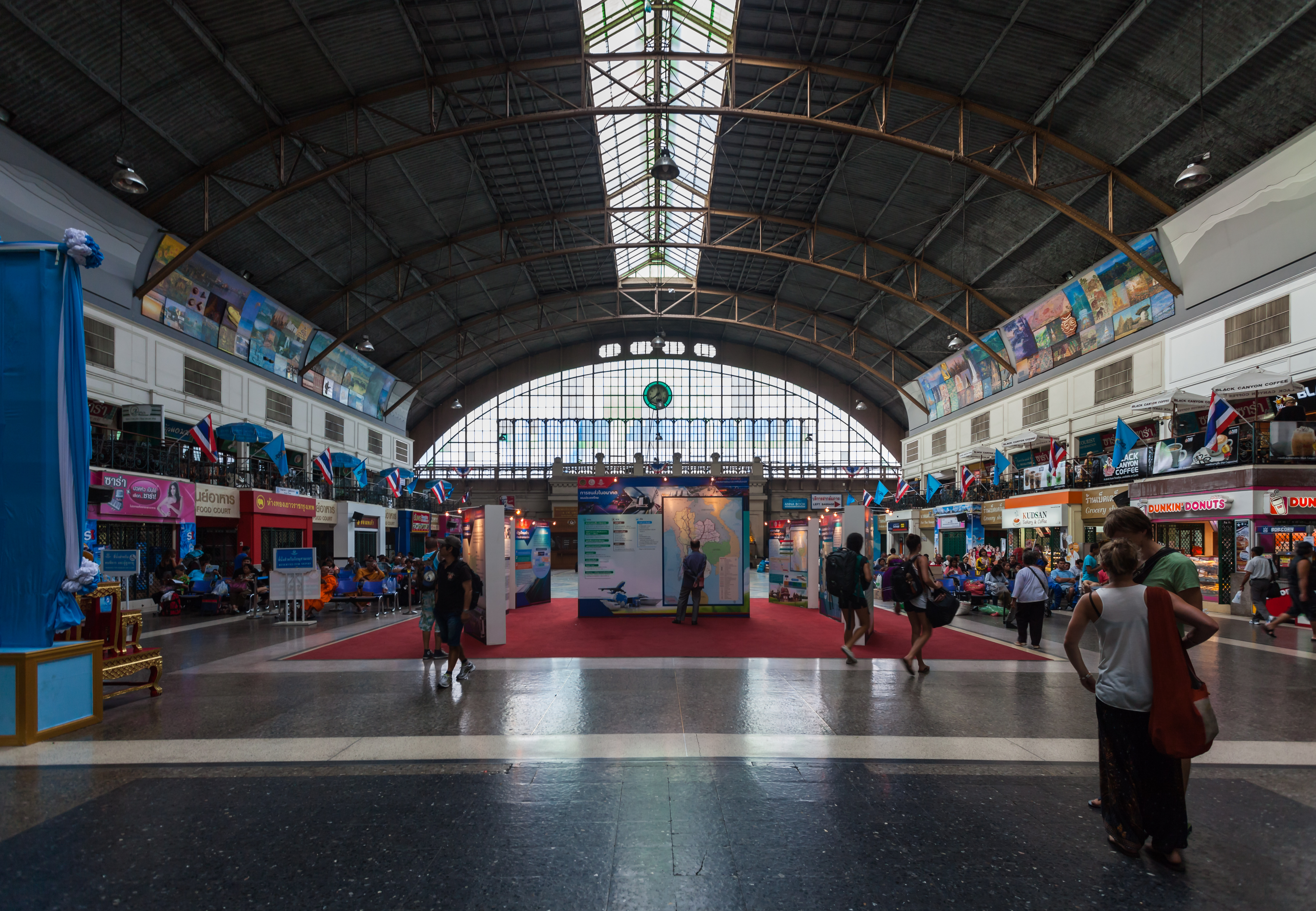
Hua Lamphong interior (August 2013)

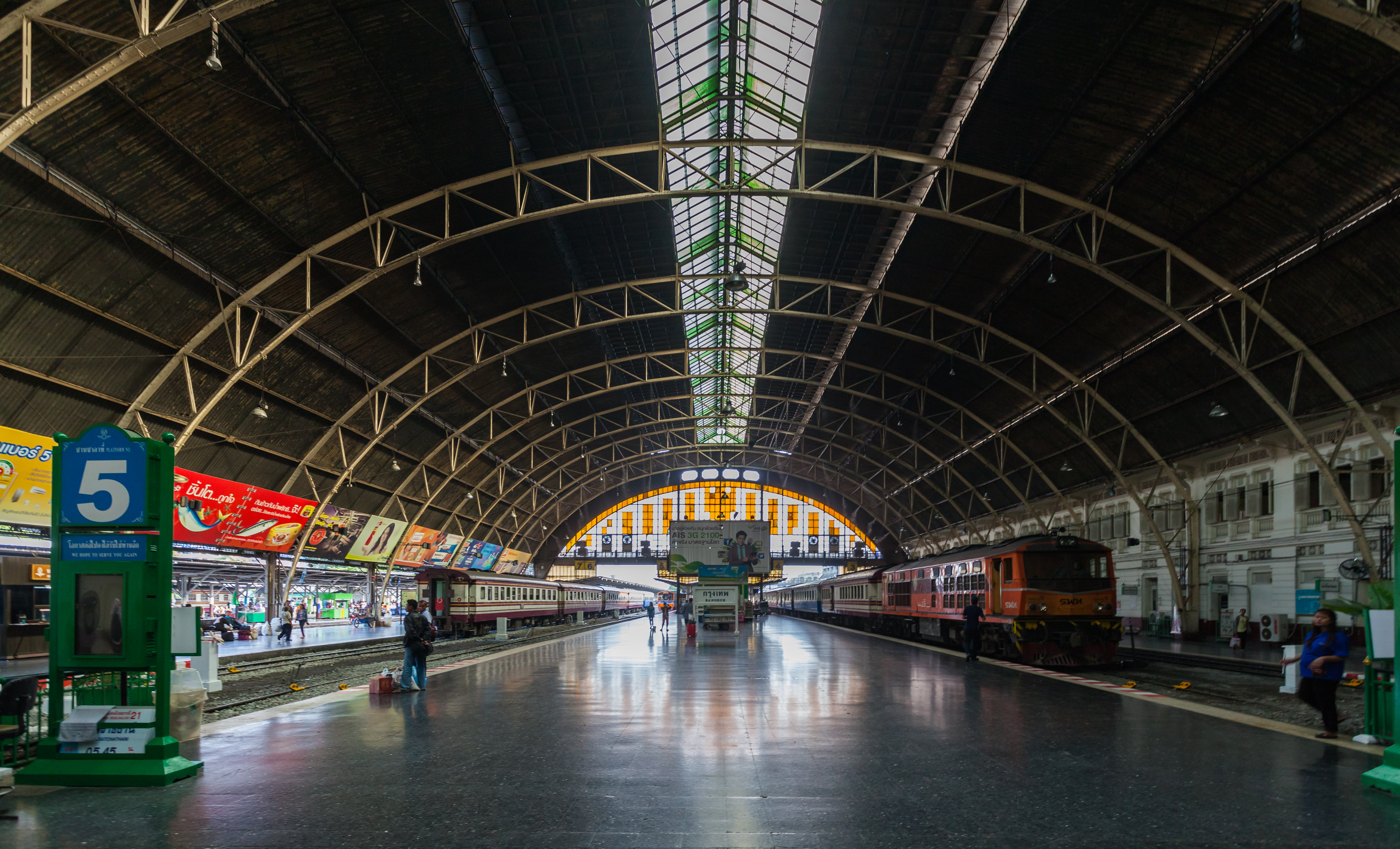
Platforms, Hua Lamphong

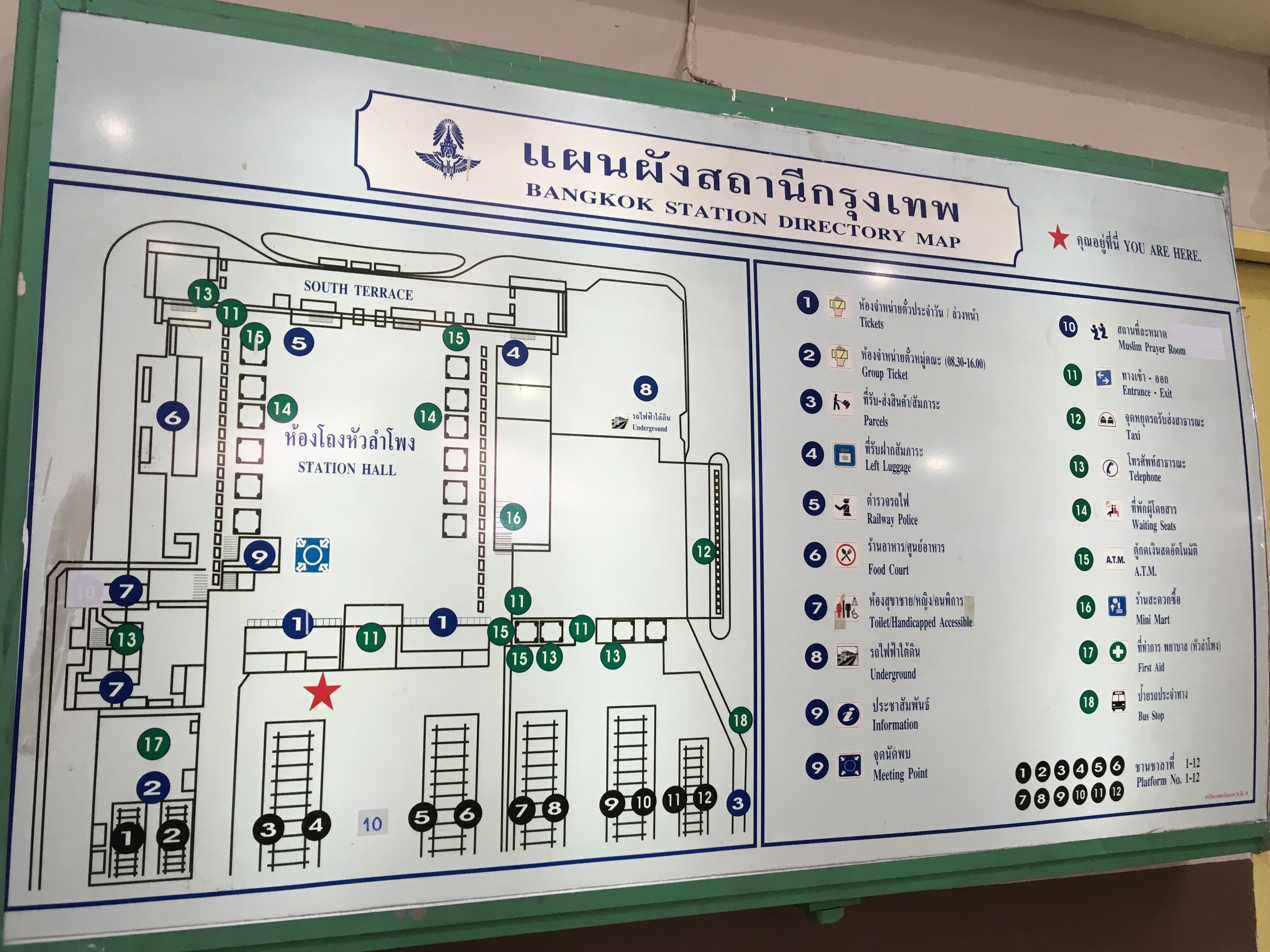
Directory map

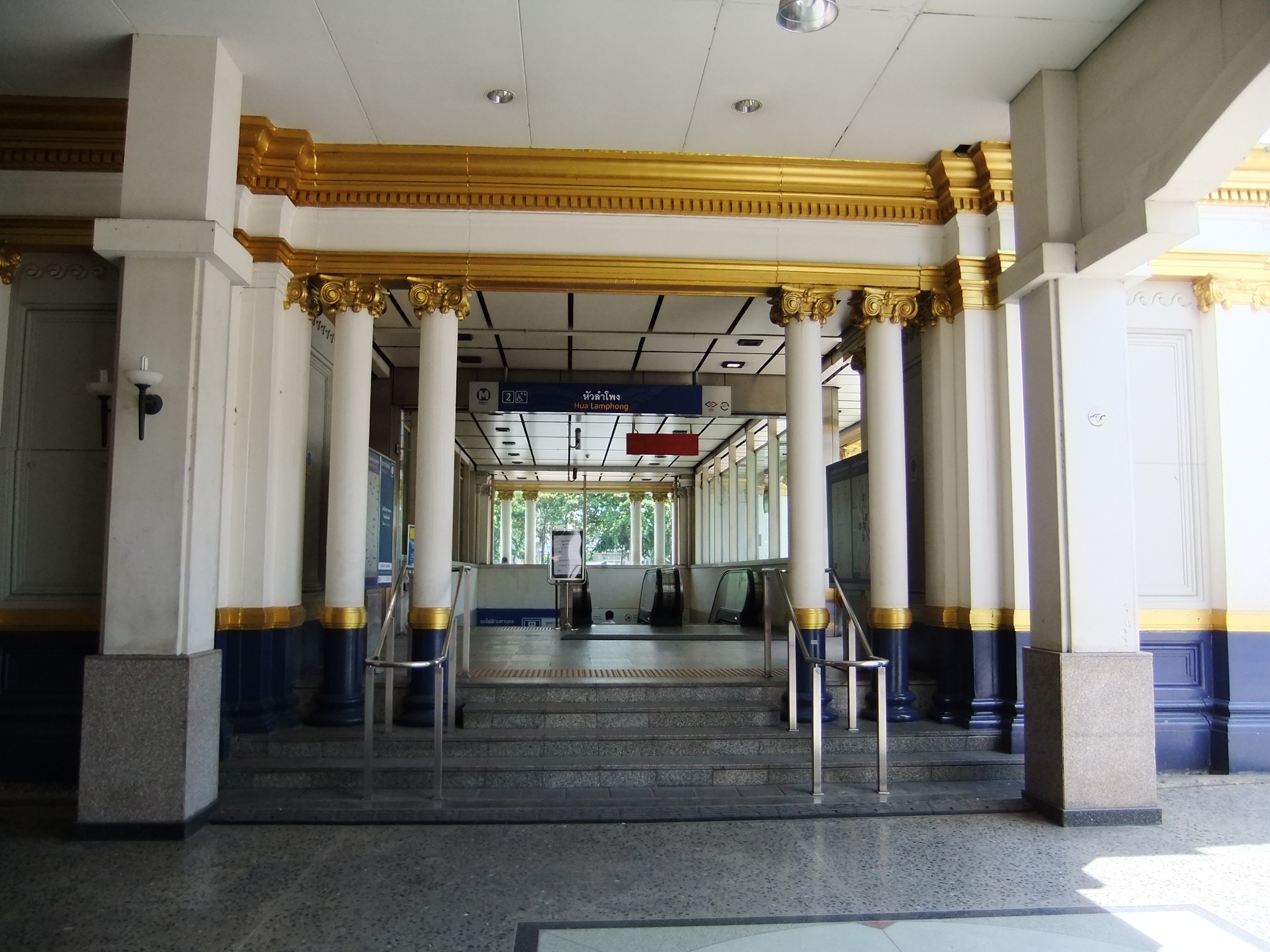
Entrance to the Hua Lamphong MRT Station

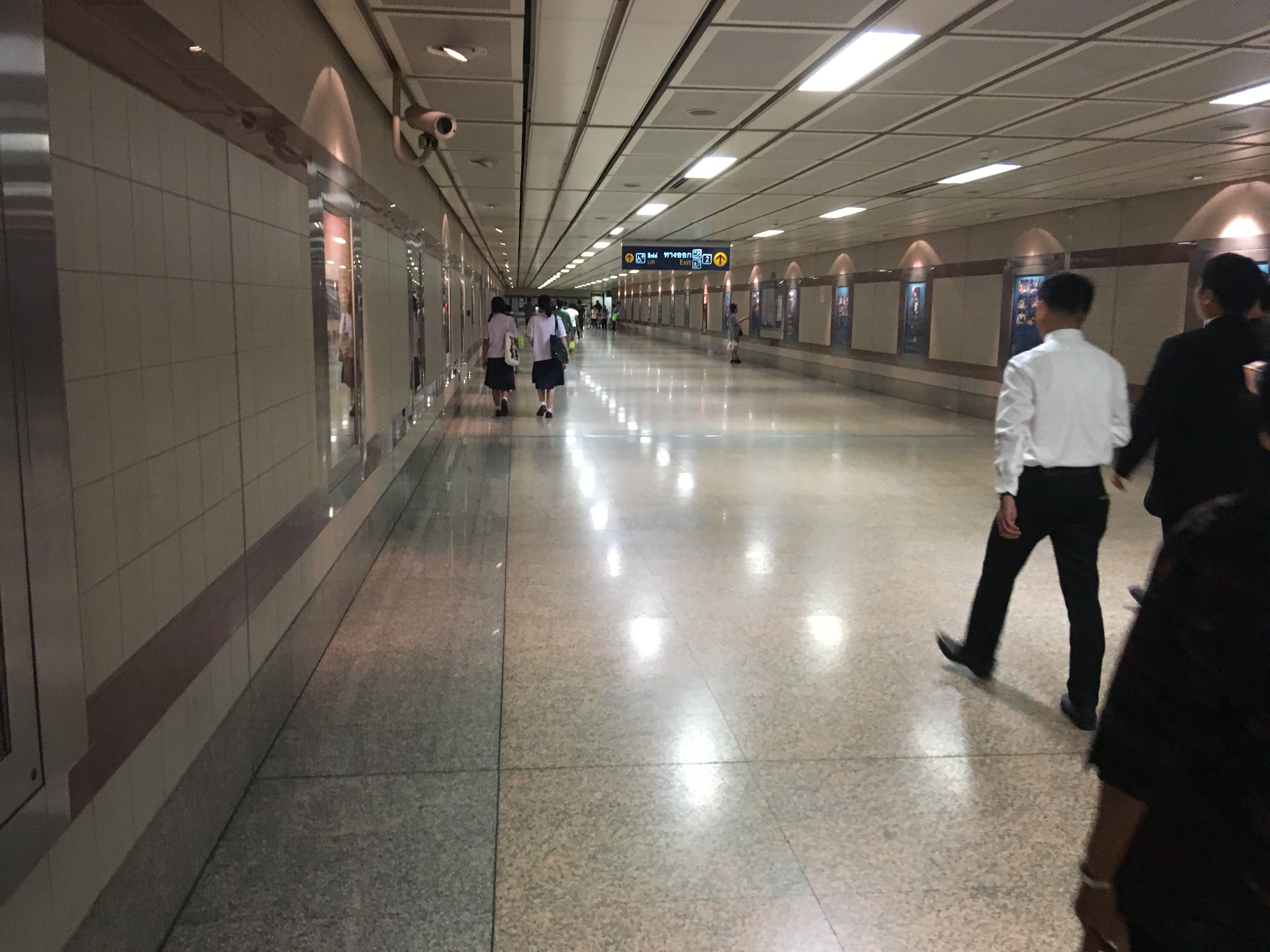
Underground corridor to the MRT Station

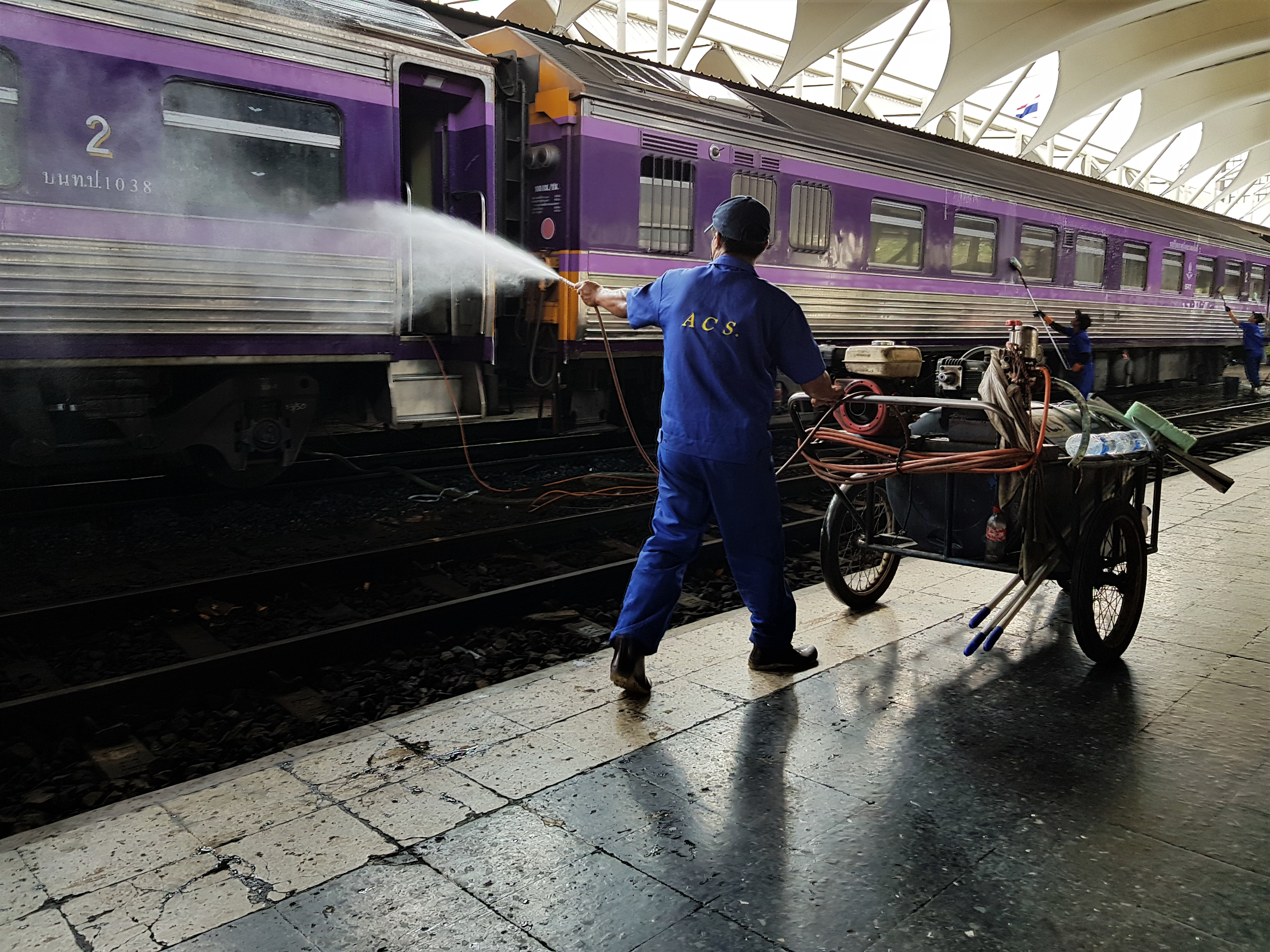
Washing a train, Hua Lamphong

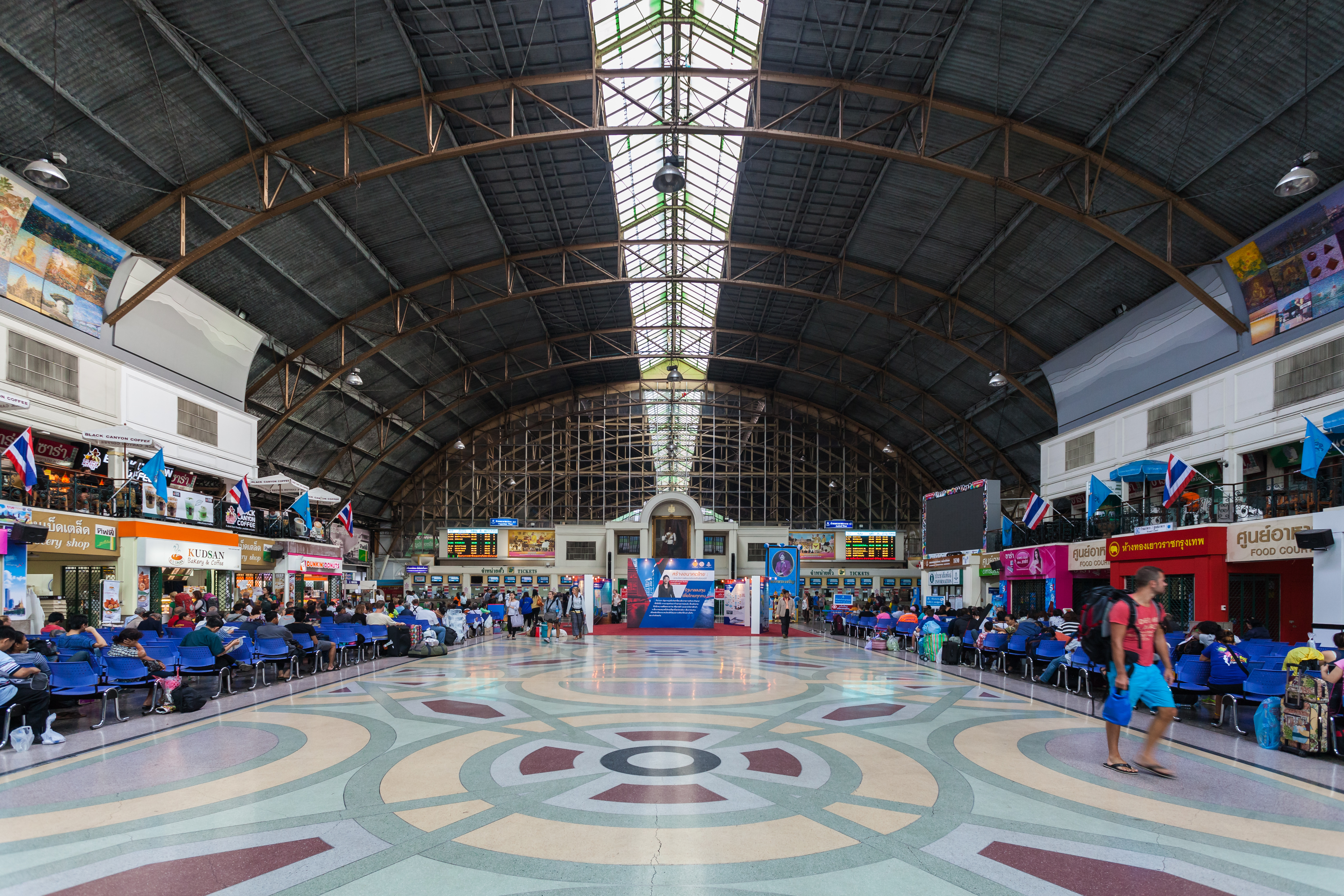
Hua Lamphong Railway Station Main Hall

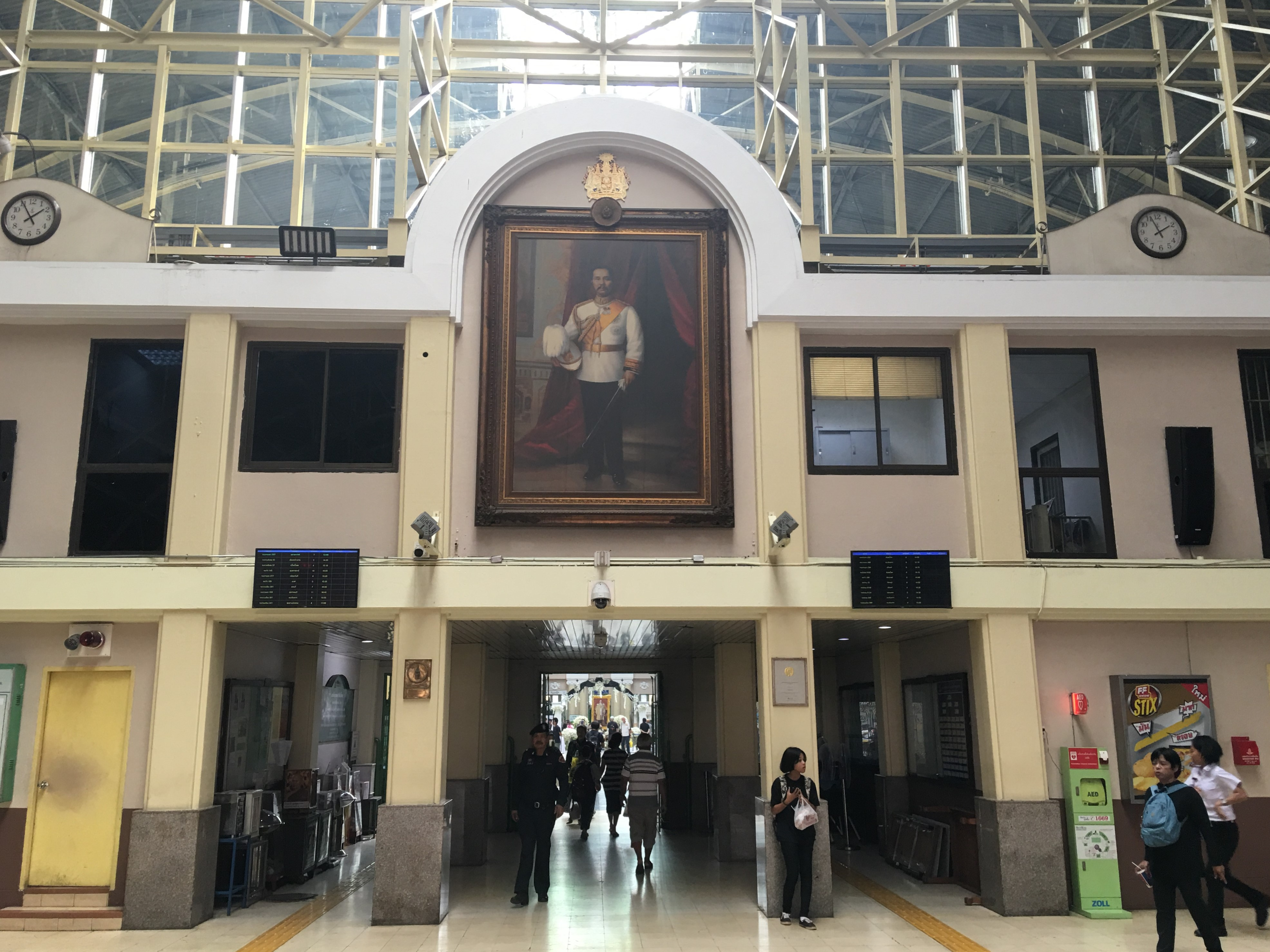
King Rama V portrait at Main Hall

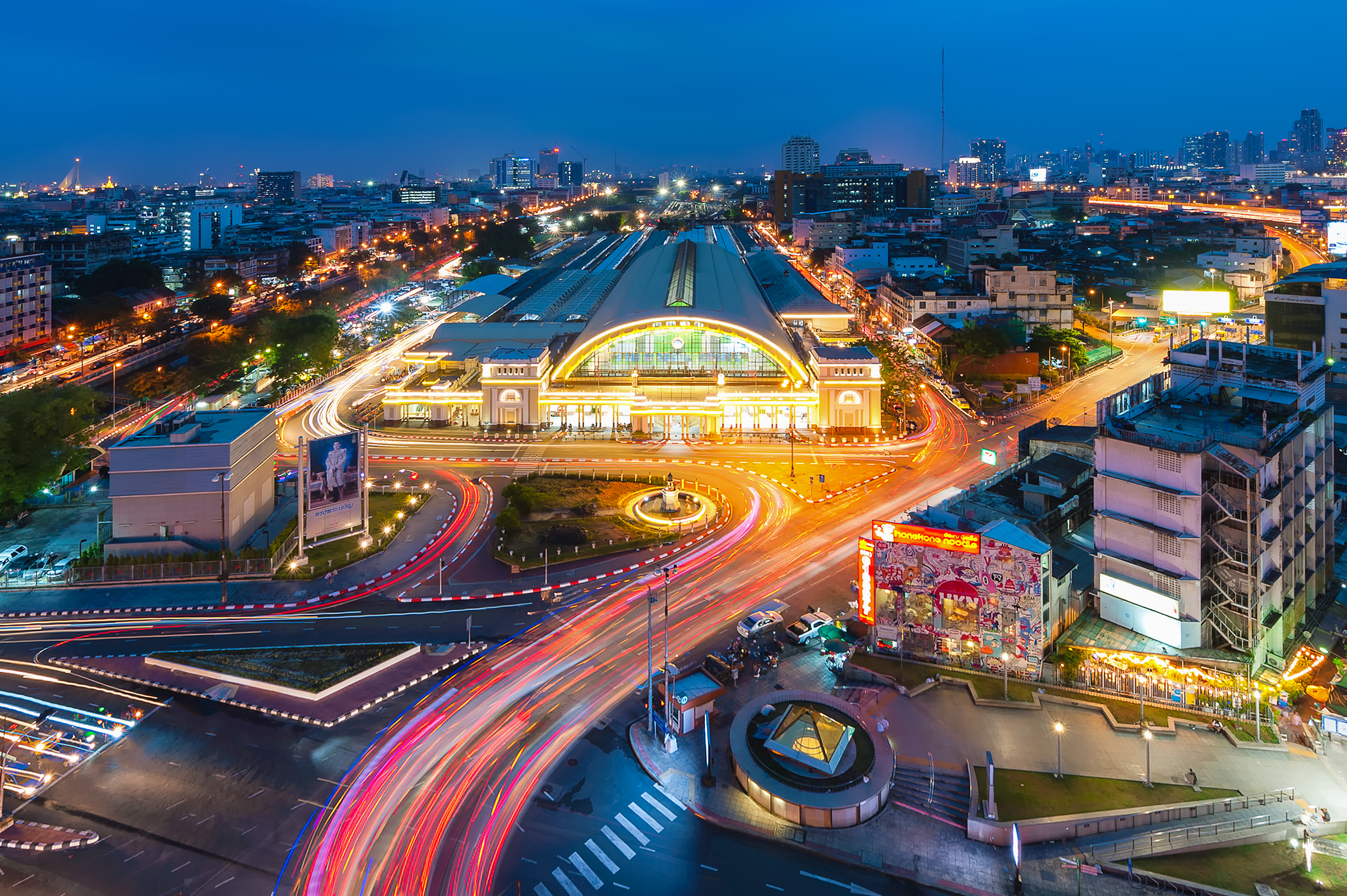
Hua Lamphong Railway Station and environs

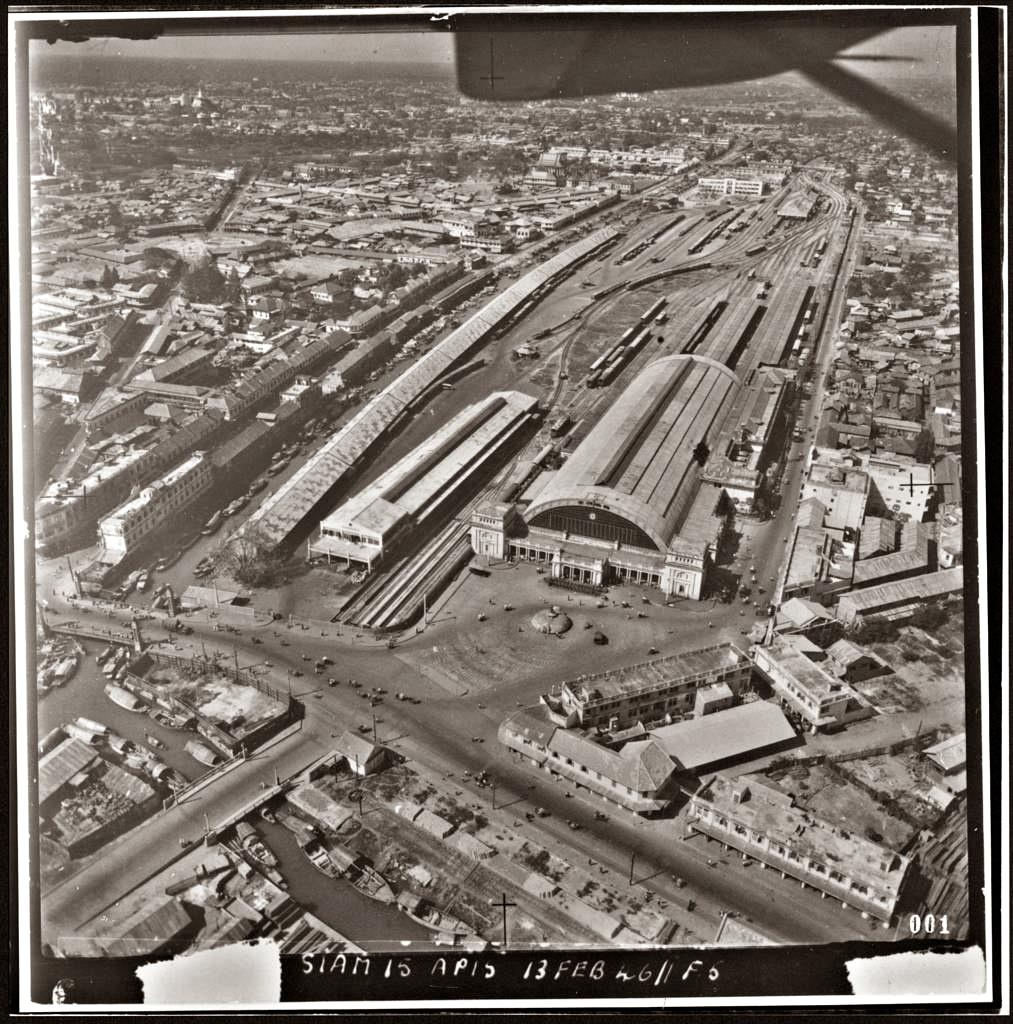
Aerial view in 1946. Note the air raid shelter in front of the station

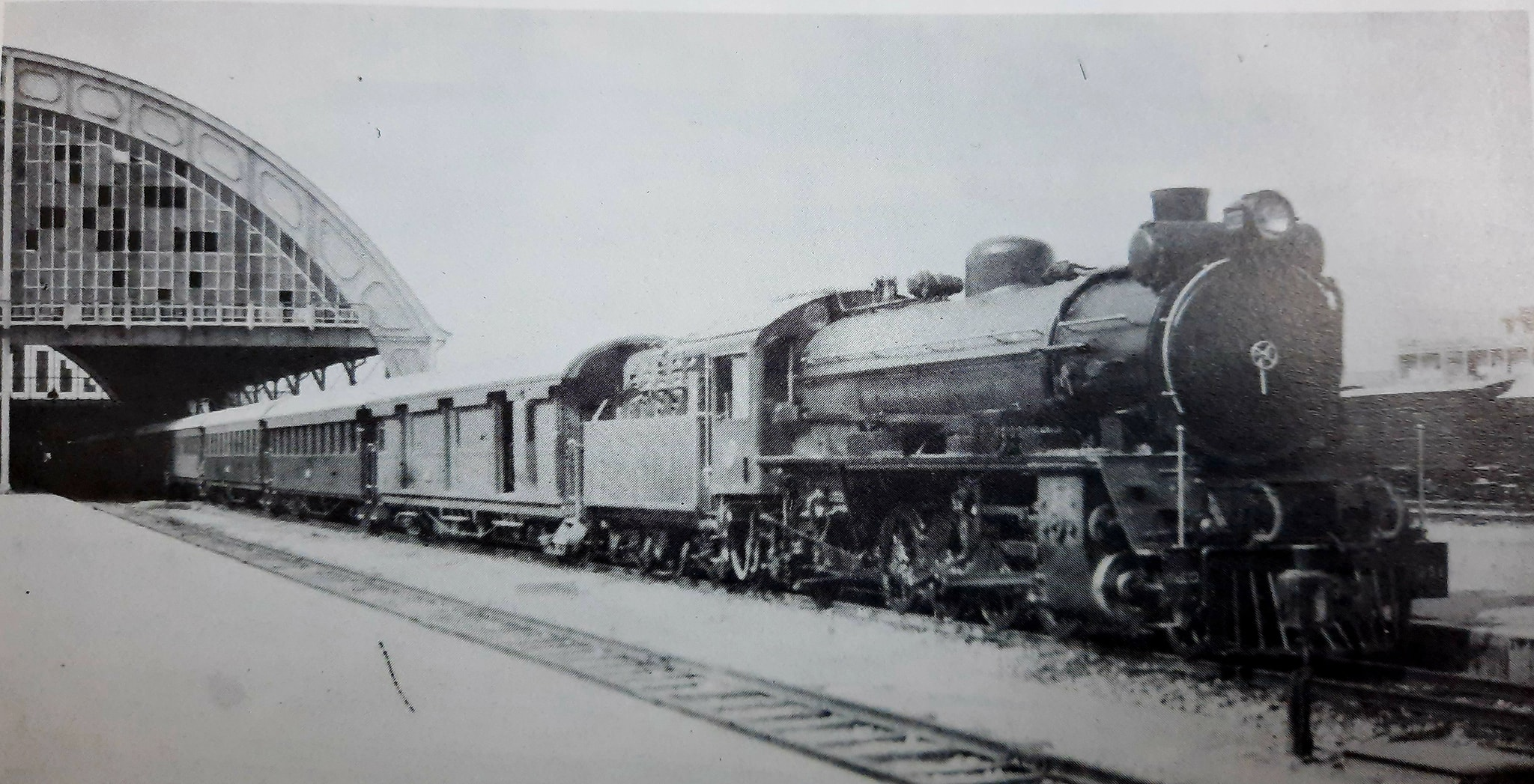
Mikado steam locomotive no.356 at the station, 1937.

== See also ==
- List of railway stations in Thailand
- Thon Buri railway station
- Krung Thep Aphiwat Central Terminal
