= Mario Tamagno =

Italian architect (1877–1941)

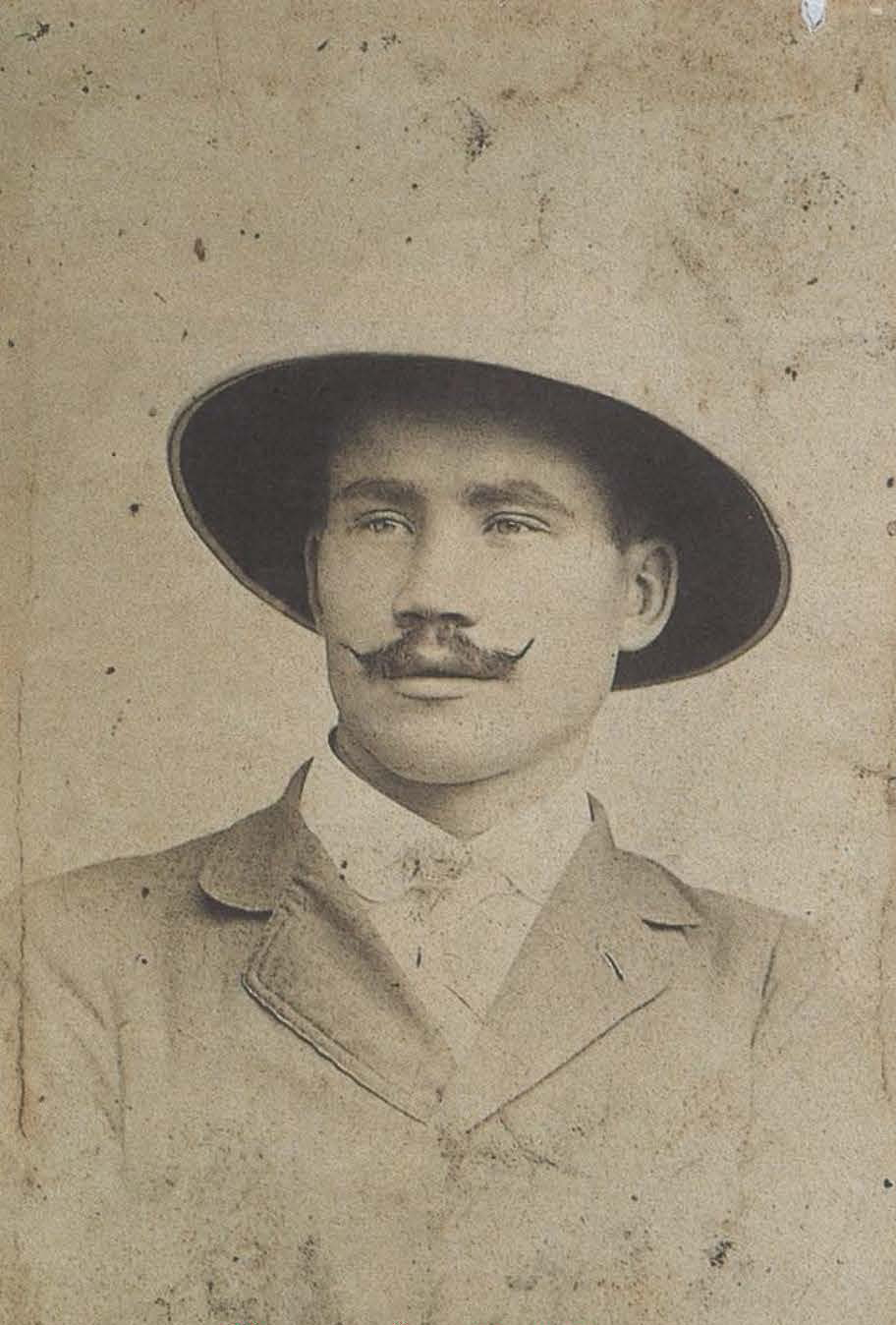
- Born: 19 June 1877; Turin, Italy
- Died: 1941 (aged 63–64)
- Education: Accademia Albertina di Belle Arti
- Occupation: Architect
- Practice: Government of Siam
- Buildings: Ananta Samakhom Throne Hall (1908–15; collaboration); Hua Lamphong Railway Station (1907)

Mario Tamagno (19 June 1877 – 1941) was an Italian architect who worked mainly in early 20th-century Siam (modern-day Thailand).

== Biography ==
Tamagno was educated at the Albertina Academy of Fine Arts in Turin, Italy, where he became an instructor after graduating in 1895. He travelled to Siam in 1900, where he entered employment with the Siamese government in a twenty-five-year contract. He was among many Westerners, particularly Italians, who were employed as architects and civil engineers during the reign of King Chulalongkorn. He produced many works and collaborated extensively with Annibale Rigotti, most notably on the Ananta Samakhom Throne Hall.

After the end of his contract (1900–1925), Tamagno was asked by the Siamese government to continue his work for Villa Norasing (today House of Government) during its last phase of construction. In May 1926, he returned to Italy with a lifetime retirement income from the Government of Siam.

== Notable contributions ==
- Makkhawan Rangsan Bridge
- Oriental Hotel
- First branch of the Siam Commercial Bank
- Private residence of Chaophraya Thammasakmontri (1899), currently operating as a cultural and civic hub called Bangkok 1899
- Phitsanulok Mansion
- Bang Khun Phrom Palace (1906)
- Suan Kularb Residential Hall and Abhisek Dusit Throne Hall in the Dusit Palace
- Hua Lamphong Railway Station (1907)
- Neilson Hays Library (1920–1922)

Collaborations with Annibale Rigotti

- Wat Benchamabophit (under Prince Narisara Nuvadtivongs)
- Nongkhran Samoson Hall in Suan Sunandha Palace (1911)
- Siam pavilion at the 1911 Turin International world's fair
- Santa Cruz Church (1913, reconstruction), not mentioned in Mario Tamagno's records
- Thewarat Sapharom Throne Hall in the Phaya Thai Palace (c.1910)
