= Ananta Samakhom Throne Hall =

Throne hall in Dusit Palace, Bangkok, Thailand

Ananta Samakhom Throne Hall พระที่นั่งอนันตสมาคม
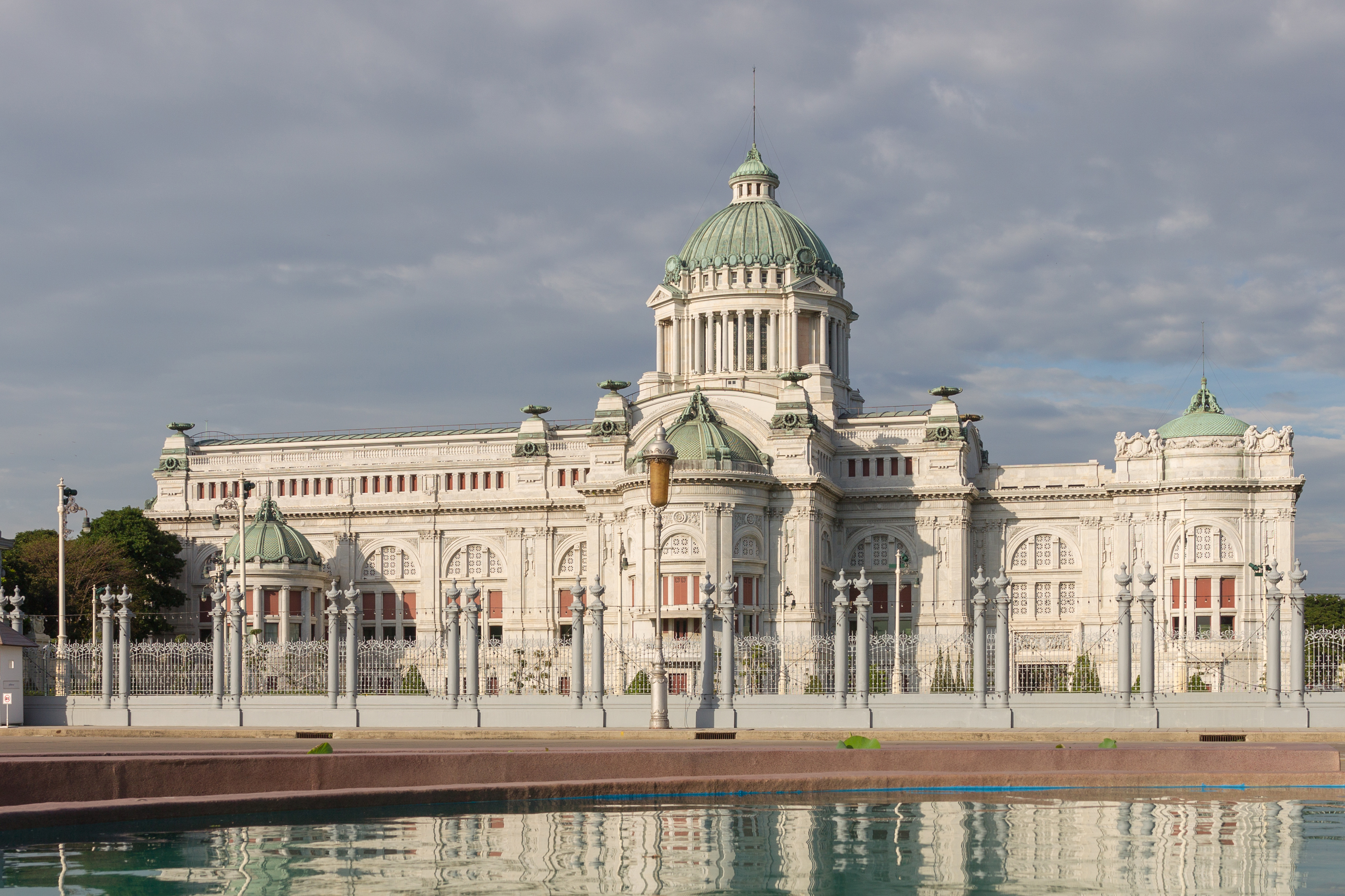
- Ananta Samakhom Throne Hall from the south

- Location within Thailand

General information
- Type: Throne Hall
- Architectural style: Neo-Renaissance & Neo-Classic
- Location: Dusit Palace, Thailand
- Coordinates: 13.771649°N 100.513251°E
- Construction started: 1908
- Completed: 1915
- Cost: 15 million Siamese Baht

Design and construction
- Architect: Mario Tamagno
- Known for: Reception hall for the king of Thailand

The Ananta Samakhom Throne Hall (Thai: พระที่นั่งอนันตสมาคม: Phra Thinang Anantasamakhom: translated as 'The place of immense gathering') is a royal reception hall in Dusit Palace in Bangkok, Thailand. It was commissioned by King Chulalongkorn (Rama V) in 1908. The building was completed in 1915, five years after Rama V's death in 1910. It is now employed from time to time for state occasions.

Until October 2017, when it indefinitely closed to the public, the hall was open to visitors as a museum and housed the Arts of the Kingdom exhibition, which showcased handicrafts produced under the sponsorship of the Queen Sirikit Institute.

== History ==
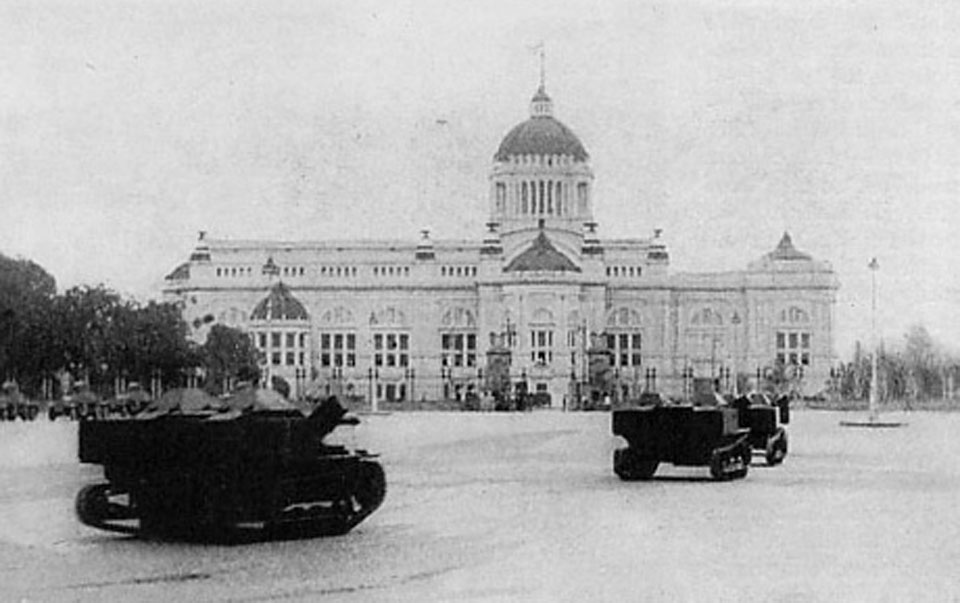
Ananta Samakhom Throne Hall during the 1932 Revolution

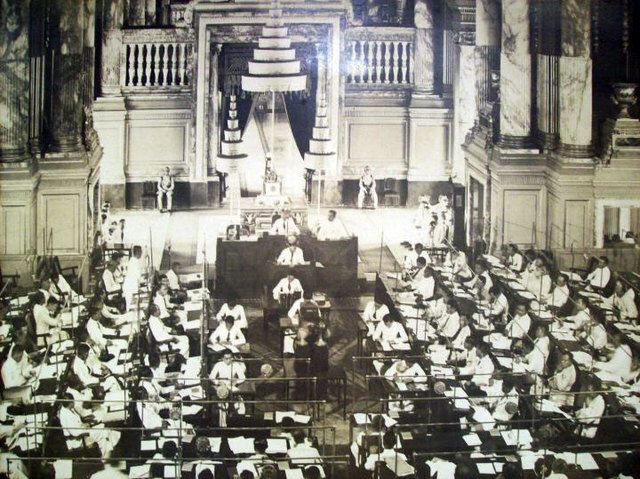
Ananta Samakhom Throne Hall served as the seat of the Parliament of Thailand from 1932 to 1974.

One year after the completion of the Amphorn Sathan Residential Hall in 1906, King Chulalongkorn (Rama V) commissioned the construction of a grand European-style reception hall for use by the royal court inside Dusit Palace. The king named the hall Phra Thinang Ananta Samakhom. The name was the same as a throne hall built by his father King Mongkut (Rama IV) in 1859, in the Grand Palace. The old throne hall was later demolished by order of Chulalongkorn and the name was later reused for the new edifice.

Chulalongkorn laid the foundation stone of the throne hall on the 40th anniversary of his first coronation 11 November 1908. Design of the throne hall, to be built in Italian Renaissance and neoclassical style, was first given to the Prussian C. Sandreczki. Later, two Italian architects Mario Tamagno and Annibale Rigotti took over much of the work, with engineering work by Carlo Allegri and G.E. Gollo. Marble from Carrara, Italy and other foreign materials were used. Italian sculptor Vittorio Novi, who would later also work on the Mahadthai Udthit Bridge (สะพานมหาดไทยอุทิศ), was employed with his nephew Rudolfo Nolli. Construction took eight years and was completed in 1915 during the reign of King Vajiravudh (Rama VI). The throne hall was used for royal ceremonies and receptions, as well as a gallery for the king's art collection mostly purchased on his two trips to Europe.

During the four days of the 1932 Revolution (24–27 June), the Khana Ratsadon (or the People's Party) used the throne hall as its headquarters. The party also held several princes and royal ministers as hostages inside the hall as it carried out its coup. The events transformed the country's political system from an absolute monarchy to a constitutional democracy. After the revolution, the hall was taken over by the constitutional government and the country's first parliament, the National People's Assembly of Siam was first convened here on 28 June 1932. Henceforth the hall was used as the seat of the legislative branch until 1974 when the new Parliament House was opened to the north. After the move, the structure was returned to the royal court and once more became a part of the Dusit Palace. Today many ceremonies are held in the throne hall, the most visible being the state opening of parliament, where the king gives a speech from the throne, opening the legislative session of the National Assembly of Thailand.

== Exterior ==
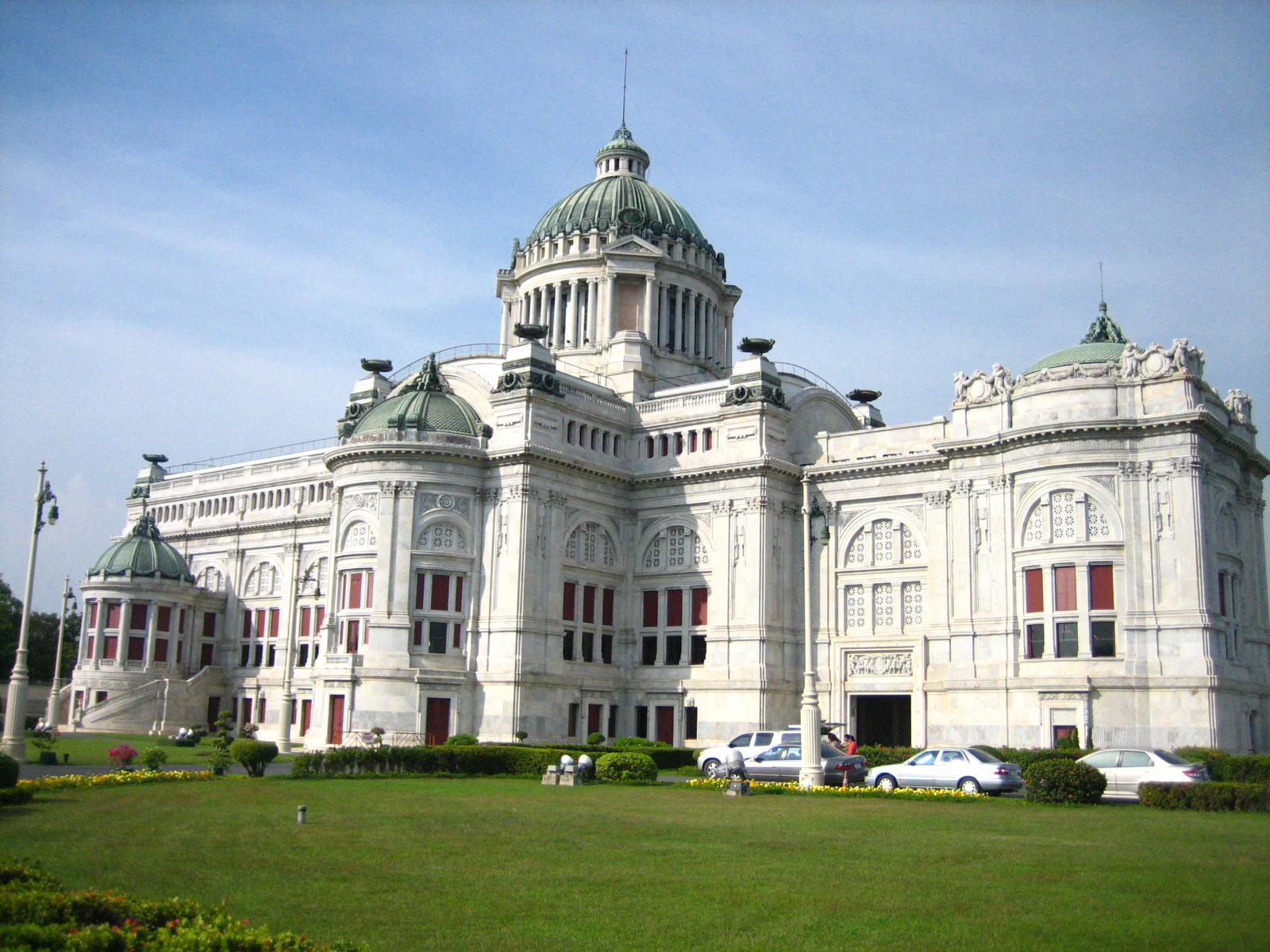
in front of Ananta Samakhom Throne Hall

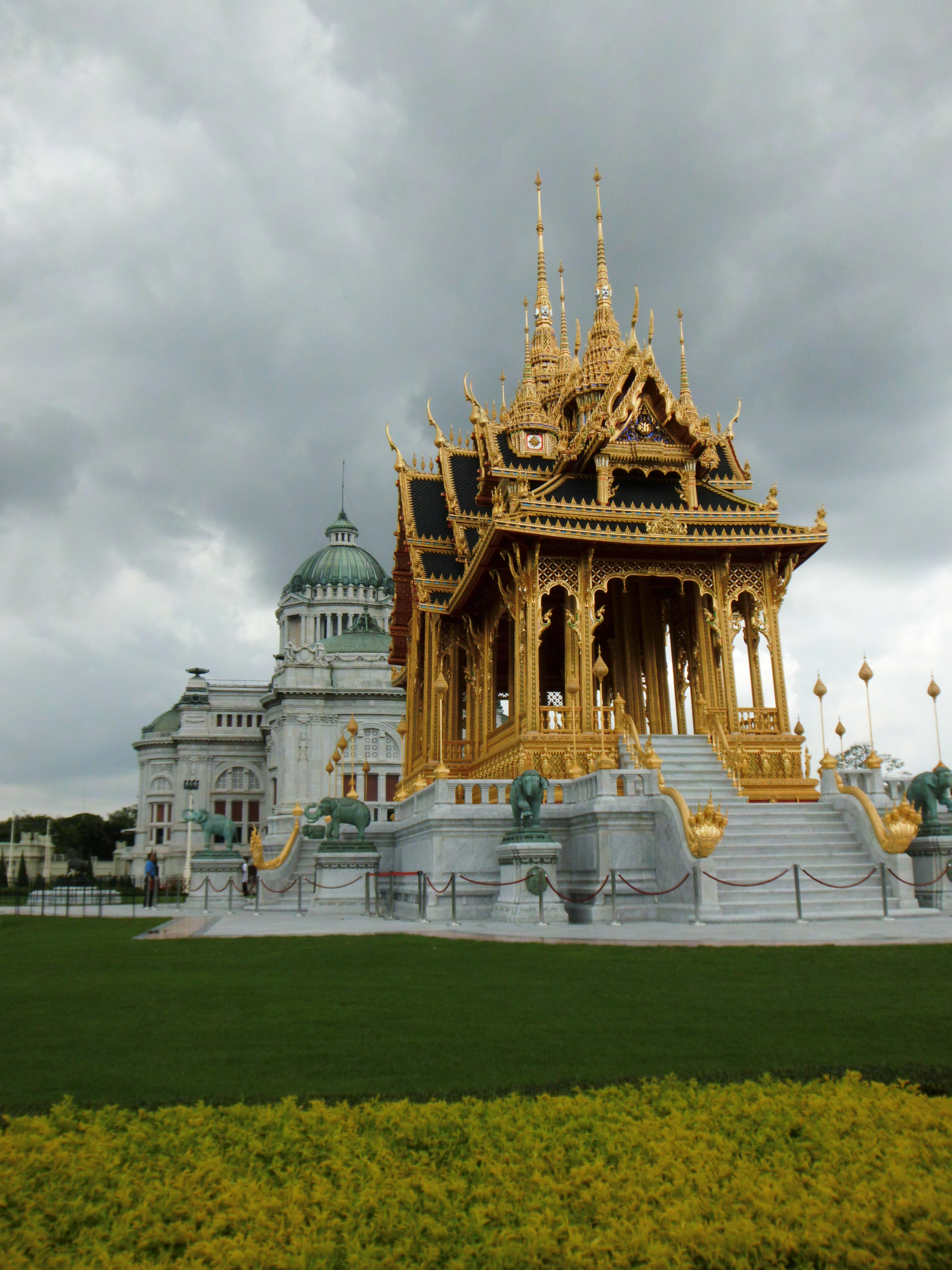
Memorial Crowns of the Auspice to the east

The throne hall is a two-storey construction with a large dome (49.5 m high) in the centre, surrounded by six smaller domes. The domes and walls are covered with paintings by Galileo Chini and Carlo Riguli depicting the history of the Chakri dynasty, from the first to the sixth reign.

In front of the hall is the Royal Plaza with the equestrian statue of King Chulalongkorn (Rama V).

== Interior ==
Frescoes in the Ananta Samakhom Throne Hall were accomplished by Galileo Chini and Carlo Riguli, who were the royal artists serving King Rama V. There are paintings on every ceiling and wall of the dome depicting the history of the Chakri dynasty. The northern dome exhibits the picture of King Rama I leading his armies back to Thailand after defeating the Khmer and later crowned as the first king of the Chakri dynasty. The eastern dome shows the contribution of King Rama II and King Rama III to arts by ordering constructions of the royal temples. The southern dome displays King Rama V's abolition of slavery. Pictures of King Rama IV (King Mongkut) surrounded by priests of various faiths are shown on the western dome, depicting the king's advocacy of all religions. Mural paintings in the middle hall narrate the royal duties of King Rama V and King Rama VI. Other parts of the hall are decorated with King Rama V's and King Rama VI's monograms, including a variety of royal emblems such as the Garuda emblem. On the balcony of the middle hall, art nouveau paintings are decorated on the walls with pictures of European women holding flower garlands.

== Visitors ==
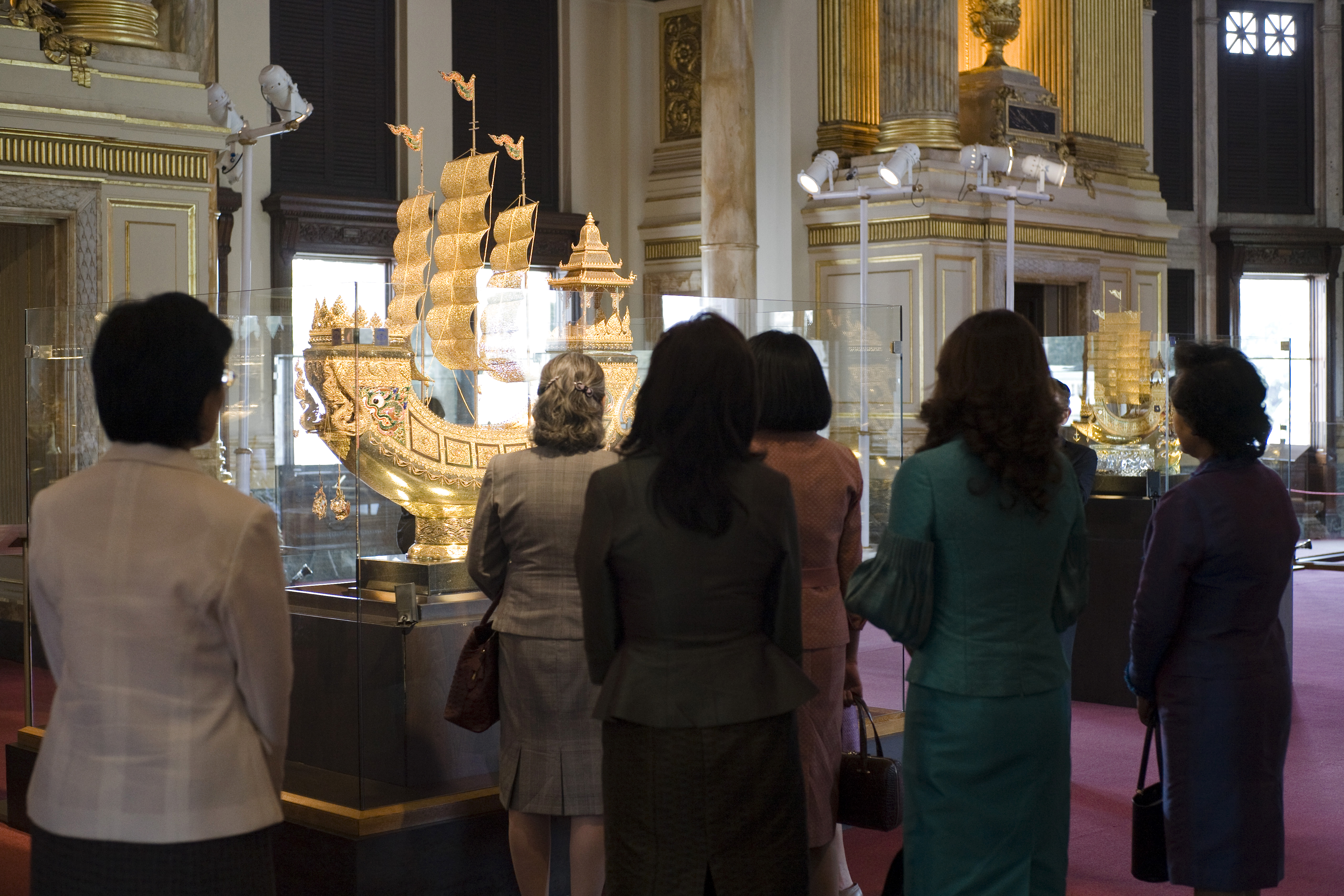
The interior of the throne hall hosts the Arts of the Kingdom exhibit, shown here in 2010 during a visit by the wife of UN Secretary-General Ban Ki-moon.

The throne previously hosted the Arts of the Kingdom exhibition, which showcased handicrafts produced under the sponsorship of the Queen Sirikit Institute. It indefinitely closed to visitors since 1 October 2017. The Arts of the Kingdom exhibition will be relocated to Ayutthaya Province.

== See also ==
Other buildings by Mario Tamagno and/or Annibale Rigotti:

- Hua Lamphong Railway Station
- Government House of Thailand
