= Annibale Rigotti =

Italian architect

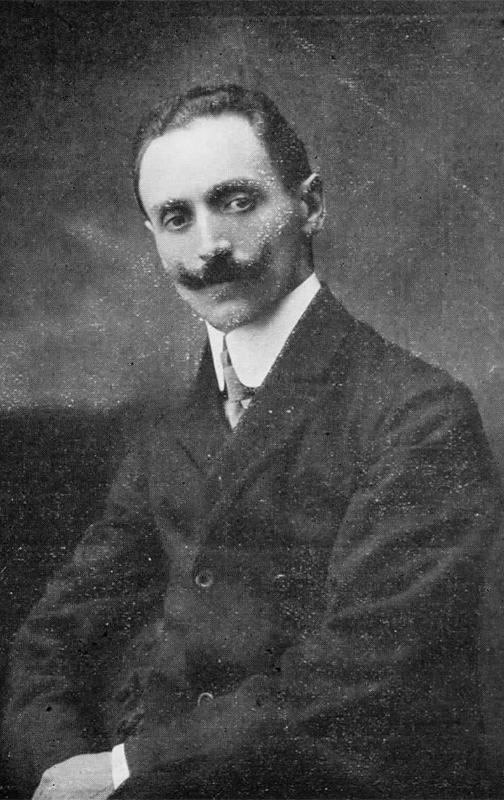
- Born: 30 October 1870; Turin, Italy
- Died: 8 March 1968 (aged 97); Turin, Italy
- Education: Accademia Albertina
- Occupation: Architect
- Buildings: Villa Falcioni, Domodossola (1902–04); Ananta Samakhom Throne Hall, Bangkok (1908–15; collaboration)

Annibale Rigotti (30 October 1870 – 8 March 1968) was an Italian architect, teacher, designer and urban planner.

== Biography ==
Born in Turin, he was educated in architecture at the Albertina Academy of Fine Arts and graduated in 1890. In 1893 he accompanied Raimondo d'Aronco to work on the Istanbul Exhibition of Agriculture and Industry in Turkey, but the exhibition was cancelled due to the 1894 Istanbul earthquake. He worked on the restoration of Yıldız Palace, designed a railway station in Konya and two theatres in Bulgaria (1893–96). He soon returned to Italy, where he married Maria Calvi on 1 December 1890. He produced numerous architectural works, including the Villa Falconi in Domodossola, which has been regarded as one of his finest works, and became the editor of the L'artista moderno in 1902.

He travelled to Siam (Thailand) in 1907, where he collaborated with Mario Tamagno and engineer Carlo Allegri to design the Ananta Samakhom Throne Hall. He returned to Italy in 1909 before the hall's completion, but acted as a coordinator for the delivery of materials and supplies. He went to Bangkok again in 1923 and stayed until 1926. During this time he designed Villa Norasingh and the gardens of Saranrom Palace, and served as chief architect in the Public Works Department. He continued working in Turin, collaborating with D'Aronco and, later, his son Giorgio Rigotti, with whom he designed the Palazzo a Vela in 1961.

Rigotti served many teaching positions. He taught at the Germano Sommeiller Technical Institute from 1893 to 1923, the Polytechnic University of Turin from 1910, and the Turin Royal School of Architecture from 1931 to 1933. He died on 8 March 1968 in Turin.

== Notable contributions ==
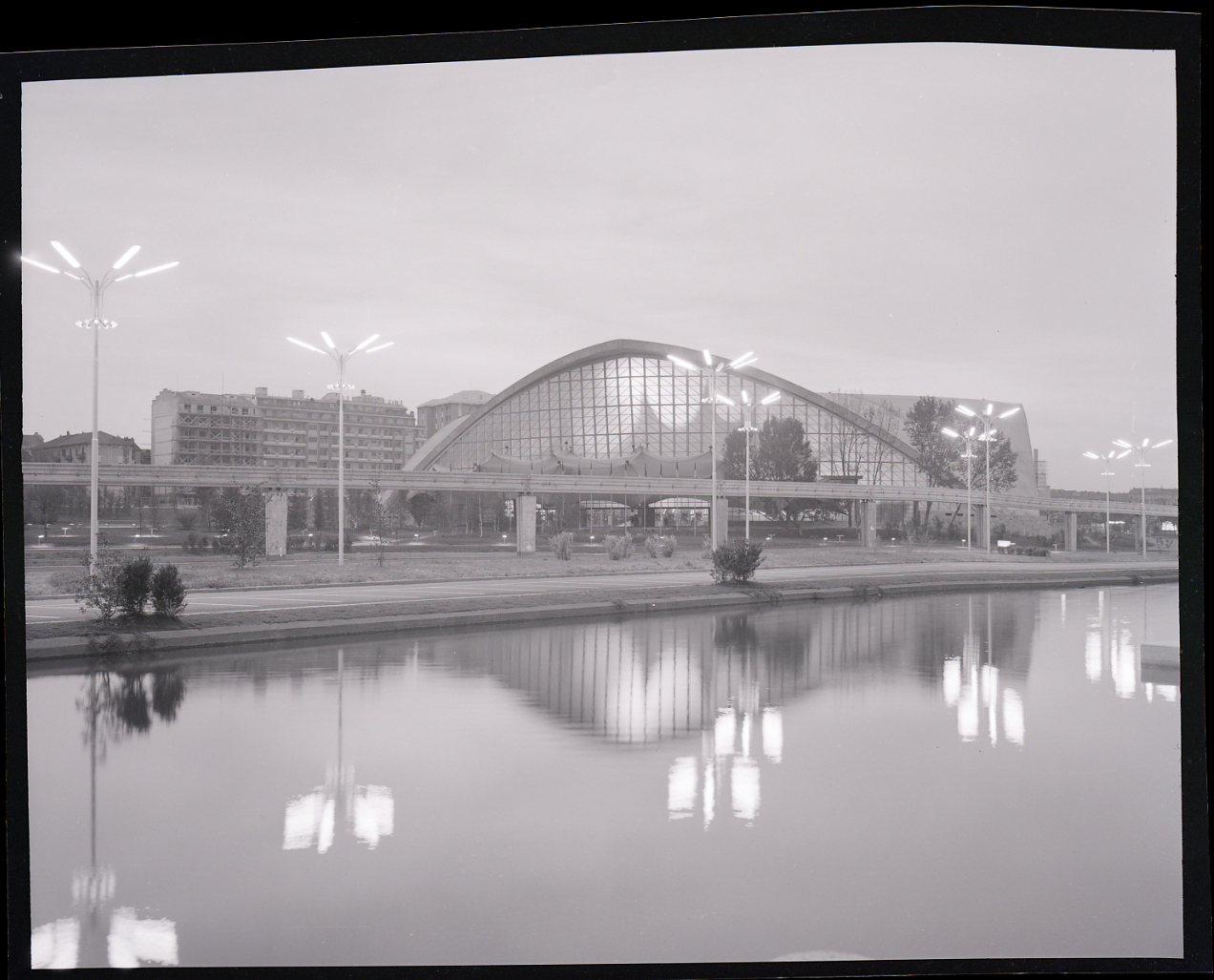
Palazzo a Vela. Photo by Paolo Monti, Turin, 1961

- Giaccone house, Turin (1890–93; with Raimondo d'Aronco and Riccardo Brayda)
- Konya Railway Station, Turkey (1893–96)
- Municipal theatres in Varna and Sitov, Bulgaria (1893–96)
- Elementary school at Sommariva del Bosco, Cuneo (1897)
- Cagliari town hall (1897)
- Palazzina Vitale, Turin (1898)
- "Oil and wine" Pavilion and Banfi Pavilion at the Prima Esposizione Internazionale d'Arte Decorativa Moderna (1902)
- Villa Falcioni, Domodossola (1902–04)
- Toesca house, Turin (1903)
- Cogne Railway Station, Aosta (1904)
- Palazzina Baravalle, Turin (1906)
- Ananta Samakhom Throne Hall, Bangkok, Thailand (1908–15; collaboration)
- Siam Commercial Bank, Bangkok (1910)
- Siam pavilion at the 1911 Turin International (with Mario Tamagno)
- Layout of Piazza d'Armi, Turin (1912; urban planning, with Raimondo d'Aronco)
- Development plan for Mondovì, Cuneo (1915)
- Villa Norasingh, Bangkok (1923–25; collaboration)
- Circolo degli Artisti, Turin (1915)
- Fabbrica Italiana Tubi Metallici factory, Turin (1937–38; with Giorgio Rigotti)
- Palazzo a Vela, Turin (1961, with Giorgio Rigotti)
