= Siam Commercial Bank, Talat Noi Branch =

Bank branch in Bangkok, Thailand

Coordinates: 13.7318°N 100.5129°E

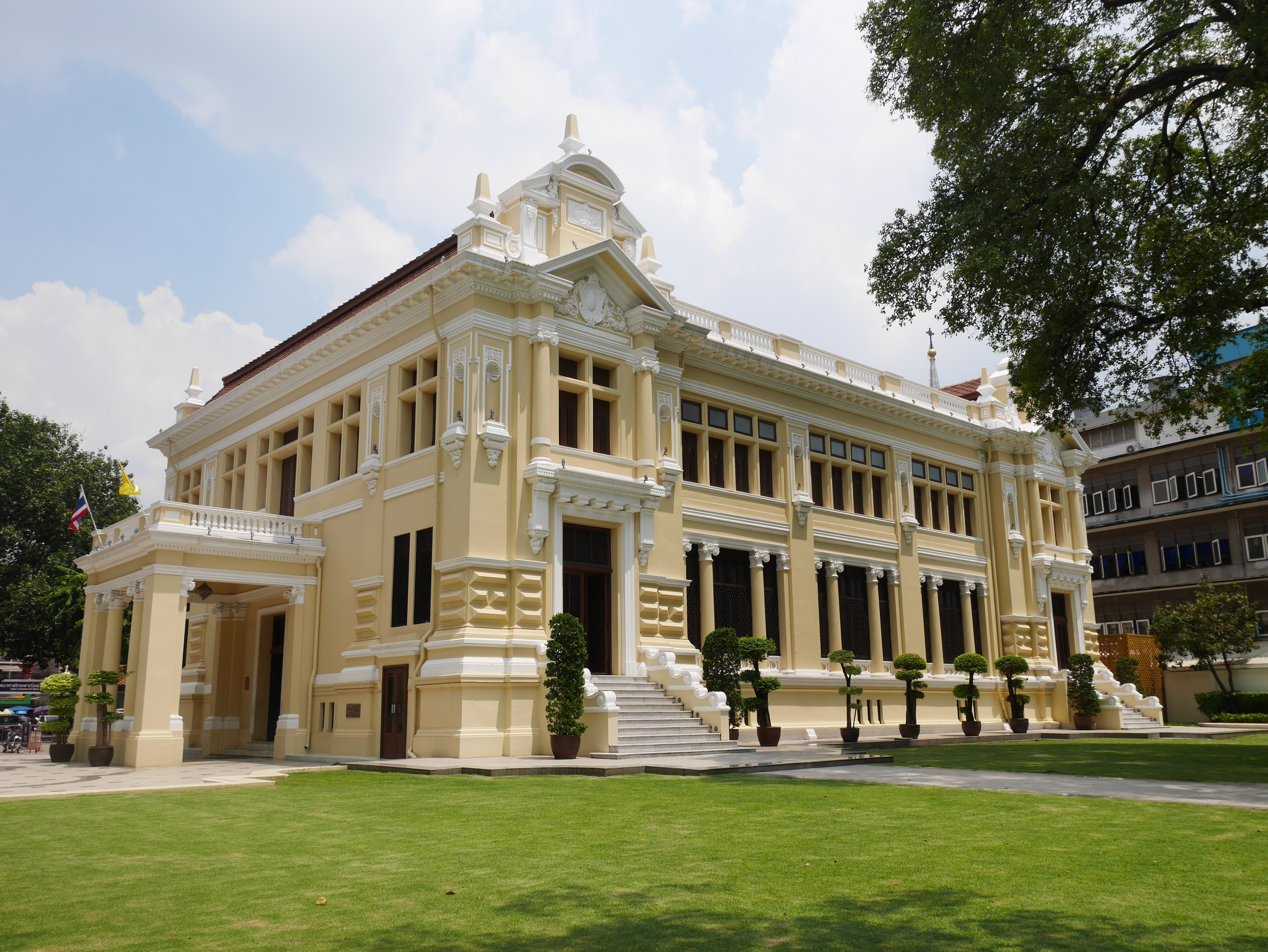
The bank building

The Talat Noi Branch is Siam Commercial Bank's first permanent office, and the oldest operating bank branch in Thailand. It is located in Talat Noi Subdistrict of Bangkok's Samphanthawong District, at the periphery of Bangkok's Chinatown. The building, designed by Italian architect Annibale Rigotti in the Beaux-Arts style, was built in 1908 or 1910. It sits on the bank of the Chao Phraya River, almost next to the Holy Rosary Church, and is listed by the Fine Arts Department as an unregistered ancient monument. The building received the ASA Architectural Conservation Award in 1982, and underwent renovations in 1995.
